Iridaceae is a family of monocotyledonous flowering plants (anthophytes) in the order Asparagales, the asparagoid lilies. The family takes its name from the irises, meaning rainbow, referring to its many colours. There are 66 accepted genera with a total of c. 2244 species worldwide. It includes a number of other well known cultivated plants, such as freesias, gladioli and crocuses. Members of this family are perennial plants, with a bulb, corm or rhizome. The plants grow erect, and have leaves that are generally grass-like, with a sharp central fold.

23,420 species of vascular plant have been recorded in South Africa, making it the sixth most species-rich country in the world and the most species-rich country on the African continent. Of these, 153 species are considered to be threatened. Nine biomes have been described in South Africa: Fynbos, Succulent Karoo, desert, Nama Karoo, grassland, savanna, Albany thickets, the Indian Ocean coastal belt, and forests.

The 2018 South African National Biodiversity Institute's National Biodiversity Assessment plant checklist lists 35,130 taxa in the phyla Anthocerotophyta (hornworts (6)), Anthophyta (flowering plants (33534)), Bryophyta (mosses (685)), Cycadophyta (cycads (42)), Lycopodiophyta (Lycophytes(45)), Marchantiophyta (liverworts (376)), Pinophyta (conifers (33)), and Pteridophyta (cryptogams (408)).

65 genera are represented in the literature. Listed taxa include species, subspecies, varieties, and forms as recorded, some of which have subsequently been allocated to other taxa as synonyms, in which cases the accepted taxon is appended to the listing. Multiple entries under alternative names reflect taxonomic revision over time.

Acidanthera 
Genus Acidanthera:
 Acidanthera capensis (Houtt.) Baker. accepted as Ixia paniculata D.Delaroch. indigenous

Afrosolen 
Genus Afrosolen:
 Afrosolen bainesii (Baker) Goldblatt & J.C.Mannin. indigenous
 Afrosolen masukuensis (Vaupel & Schltr.) Goldblatt & J.C.Mannin. indigenous
 Afrosolen sandersonii (Baker) Goldblatt & J.C.Mannin. indigenous
 Afrosolen sandersonii (Baker) Goldblatt & J.C.Manning subsp. limpopoensis (Goldblatt & J.C.Manning. endemic
 Afrosolen sandersonii (Baker) Goldblatt & J.C.Manning subsp. sandersoni. indigenous

Agretta 
Genus Agretta:
 Agretta crispa Eckl. accepted as Ixia erubescens Goldblat. indigenous
 Agretta pallidiflavens Eckl. accepted as Ixia odorata Ker Gawl. indigenous
 Agretta pentandra (L.f.) Eckl. accepted as Ixia scillaris L. subsp. scillari. indigenous
 Agretta stricta Eckl. accepted as Ixia stricta (Eckl. ex Klatt) G.J.Lewi. indigenous

Anisanthus 
Genus Anisanthus:
 Anisanthus caryophyllaceus (Burm.f.) Klatt, accepted as Freesia caryophyllacea (Burm.f.) N.E.Br.

Anomatheca 
Genus Anomatheca:
 Anomatheca cruenta Lindl, accepted as Freesia laxa (Thunb.) Goldblatt & J.C.Manning subsp. laxa
 Anomatheca fistulosa (Spreng. ex Klatt) Goldblatt, accepted as Xenoscapa fistulosa (Spreng. ex Klatt) Goldblatt & J.C.Manning
 Anomatheca grandiflora Baker, accepted as Freesia grandiflora (Baker) Klatt subsp. grandiflora
 Anomatheca laxa (Thunb.) Goldblatt subsp. azurea Goldblatt & Hutchings, accepted as Freesia laxa (Thunb.) Goldblatt & J.C.Manning subsp. azurea (Goldblatt & Hutchings) Goldblatt & J.C.
 Anomatheca verrucosa (B.Vogel) Goldblatt, accepted as Freesia verrucosa (B.Vogel) Goldblatt & J.C.Manning
 Anomatheca viridis (Aiton) Goldblatt subsp. crispifolia Goldblatt, accepted as Freesia viridis (Aiton) Goldblatt & J.C.Manning subsp. viridis

Antholyza 
Genus Antholyza:
 Antholyza caryophyllaceae (Burm.f.) Roem. & Schult, accepted as Freesia caryophyllacea (Burm.f.) N.E.Br.
 Antholyza fourcadei L.Bolus, accepted as Gladiolus fourcadei (L.Bolus) Goldblatt & M.P.de Vos

Aristea 
Genus Aristea:
 Aristea abyssinica Pax, indigenous
 Aristea africana (L.) Hoffmanns, endemic
 Aristea anceps Eckl. ex Klatt, endemic
 Aristea angolensis Baker, indigenous
 Aristea angolensis Baker subsp. acutivalvis Weim, indigenous
 Aristea angolensis Baker subsp. angolensis, indigenous
 Aristea angolensis Baker subsp. majubensis (Baker) Weim, accepted as Aristea angolensis Baker subsp. angolensis
 Aristea angolensis Baker subsp. pulchella Weim, endemic
 Aristea bakeri Klatt, endemic
 Aristea biflora Weim, endemic
 Aristea bracteata Pers, endemic
 Aristea cantharophila Goldblatt & J.C.Manning, endemic
 Aristea capitata (L.) Ker Gawl, endemic
 Aristea cistiflora J.C.Manning & Goldblatt, endemic
 Aristea cognata N.E.Br. ex Weim, accepted as Aristea abyssinica Pax
 Aristea compressa Buchinger, accepted as Aristea compressa Buchinger ex Baker
 Aristea compressa Buchinger ex Baker, indigenous
 Aristea confusa Goldblatt, accepted as Aristea bakeri Klatt
 Aristea cuspidata Schinz, endemic
 Aristea dichotoma (Thunb.) Ker Gawl, endemic
 Aristea ecklonii Baker, indigenous
 Aristea elliptica Goldblatt & A.P.Dold, endemic
 Aristea ensifolia John Muir, endemic
 Aristea fimbriata Goldblatt & J.C.Manning, endemic
 Aristea flexicaulis Baker, endemic
 Aristea galpinii N.E.Br. ex Weim, indigenous
 Aristea gerrardii Weim, accepted as Aristea compressa Buchinger ex Baker, indigenous
 Aristea glauca Klatt, endemic
 Aristea grandis Weim, endemic
 Aristea inaequalis Goldblatt & J.C.Manning, endemic
 Aristea juncifolia Baker, endemic
 Aristea latifolia G.J.Lewis, endemic
 Aristea lugens (L.f.) Steud, endemic
 Aristea macrocarpa G.J.Lewis, accepted as Aristea bakeri Klatt
 Aristea major Andrews, accepted as Aristea capitata (L.) Ker Gawl.
 Aristea montana Baker, indigenous
 Aristea monticola Goldblatt, accepted as Aristea bracteata Pers.
 Aristea nana Goldblatt & J.C.Manning, endemic
 Aristea nigrescens J.C.Manning & Goldblatt, endemic
 Aristea oligocephala Baker, endemic
 Aristea palustris Schltr, endemic
 Aristea parviflora Baker, indigenous
 Aristea pauciflora Wolley-Dod, endemic
 Aristea platycaulis Baker, endemic
 Aristea pusilla (Thunb.) Ker Gawl, endemic
 Aristea pusilla (Thunb.) Ker Gawl. subsp. robustior Weim, accepted as Aristea elliptica Goldblatt & A.P.Dold
 Aristea racemosa Baker, indigenous
 Aristea racemosa Baker var. inflata Weim, endemic
 Aristea racemosa Baker var. racemosa, endemic
 Aristea recisa Weim, endemic
 Aristea rigidifolia G.J.Lewis, endemic
 Aristea rufobracteata Goldblatt & J.C.Manning, endemic
 Aristea rupicola Goldblatt & J.C.Manning, endemic
 Aristea schizolaena Harv. ex Baker, endemic
 Aristea simplex Weim, endemic
 Aristea singularis Weim, endemic
 Aristea spiralis (L.f.) Ker Gawl, endemic
 Aristea teretifolia Goldblatt & J.C.Manning, endemic
 Aristea torulosa Klatt, indigenous
 Aristea woodii N.E.Br, accepted as Aristea torulosa Klatt
 Aristea zeyheri Baker, endemic

Babiana 
Genus Babiana:
 Babiana ambigua (Roem. & Schult.) G.J.Lewis, endemic
 Babiana angustifolia Sweet, endemic
 Babiana arenicola Goldblatt & J.C.Manning, indigenous
 Babiana attenuata G.J.Lewis, endemic
 Babiana auriculata G.J.Lewis, endemic
 Babiana avicularis Goldblatt & J.C.Manning, indigenous
 Babiana bainesii Baker, indigenous
 Babiana blanda (L.Bolus) G.J.Lewis, endemic
 Babiana brachystachys (Baker) G.J.Lewis, endemic
 Babiana carminea J.C.Manning & Goldblatt, indigenous
 Babiana cedarbergensis G.J.Lewis, endemic
 Babiana cinnamomea J.C.Manning & Goldblatt, indigenous
 Babiana confusa (G.J.Lewis) Goldblatt & J.C.Manning, endemic
 Babiana crispa G.J.Lewis, endemic
 Babiana cuneata J.C.Manning & Goldblatt, endemic
 Babiana curviscapa G.J.Lewis, endemic
 Babiana disticha Ker Gawl. accepted as Babiana fragrans (Jacq.) Steud.
 Babiana dregei Baker, endemic
 Babiana ecklonii Klatt, endemic
 Babiana ecklonii Klatt var.ecklonii, accepted as Babiana ecklonii Klatt, endemic
 Babiana ecklonii Klatt var. latifolia (L.Bolus) G.J.Lewis, accepted as Babiana latifolia L.Bolus, endemic
 Babiana engysiphon J.C.Manning & Goldblatt, indigenous
 Babiana falcata G.J.Lewis, accepted as Babiana hypogaea Burch.
 Babiana fimbriata (Klatt) Baker, endemic
 Babiana flabellifolia Harv. ex Klatt, endemic
 Babiana flavida G.J.Lewis, accepted as Babiana hypogaea Burch.
 Babiana foliosa G.J.Lewis, endemic
 Babiana fourcadei G.J.Lewis, endemic
 Babiana fragrans (Jacq.) Steud. endemic
 Babiana framesii L.Bolus, endemic
 Babiana framesii L.Bolus var. kamiesbergensis G.J.Lewis, accepted as Babiana curviscapa G.J.Lewis, endemic
 Babiana gariepensis Goldblatt & J.C.Manning, indigenous
 Babiana geniculata G.J.Lewis, endemic
 Babiana grandiflora Goldblatt & J.C.Manning, indigenous
 Babiana hirsuta (Lam.) Goldblatt & J.C.Manning, endemic
 Babiana horizontalis G.J.Lewis, endemic
 Babiana hypogaea Burch. indigenous
 Babiana inclinata Goldblatt & J.C.Manning, indigenous
 Babiana karooica Goldblatt & J.C.Manning, indigenous
 Babiana klaverensis G.J.Lewis, accepted as Babiana mucronata (Jacq.) Ker Gawl. subsp. minor (G.J.Lewis) Goldblatt & J.C.Manning, endemic
 Babiana lanata Goldblatt & J.C.Manning, indigenous
 Babiana lapeirousioides Goldblatt & J.C.Manning, indigenous
 Babiana latifolia L.Bolus, endemic
 Babiana leipoldtii G.J.Lewis, endemic
 Babiana lewisiana B.Nord. endemic
 Babiana lineolata Klatt, endemic
 Babiana lobata G.J.Lewis, endemic
 Babiana longiflo (P.J.Bergius) Steud. accepted as Ixia paniculata D.Delaroche, indigenous
 Babiana longiflora Goldblatt & J.C.Manning, accepted as Babiana tubaeformis Goldblatt & J.C.Manning, endemic
 Babiana melanops Goldblatt & J.C.Manning, indigenous
 Babiana minuta G.J.Lewis, endemic
 Babiana montana G.J.Lewis, endemic
 Babiana mucronata (Jacq.) Ker Gawl. endemic
 Babiana mucronata (Jacq.) Ker Gawl. subsp. minor (G.J.Lewis) Goldblatt & J.C.Manning, endemic
 Babiana mucronata (Jacq.) Ker Gawl. subsp. mucronata, endemic
 Babiana mucronata (Jacq.) Ker Gawl. var. longituba G.J.Lewis, accepted as Babiana mucronata (Jacq.) Ker Gawl. subsp. mucronata, endemic
 Babiana mucronata (Jacq.) Ker Gawl. var. minor G.J.Lewis, accepted as Babiana mucronata (Jacq.) Ker Gawl. subsp. minor (G.J.Lewis) Goldblatt & J.C.Manning
 Babiana namaquensis Baker, indigenous
 Babiana nana (Andrews) Spreng. indigenous
 Babiana nana (Andrews) Spreng. subsp. maculata (Klatt) Goldblatt & J.C.Manning, endemic
 Babiana nana (Andrews) Spreng. subsp. nana, endemic
 Babiana nana (Andrews) Spreng. var. confusa G.J.Lewis, accepted as Babiana confusa (G.J.Lewis) Goldblatt & J.C.Manning, endemic
 Babiana nana (Andrews) Spreng. var. maculata (Klatt) B.Nord. accepted as Babiana nana (Andrews) Spreng. subsp. maculata (Klatt) Goldblatt & J.C.Manning
 Babiana noctiflora J.C.Manning & Goldblatt, indigenous
 Babiana obliqua E.Phillips, accepted as Babiana ambigua (Roem. & Schult.) G.J.Lewis, endemic
 Babiana odorata L.Bolus, endemic
 Babiana papyracea Goldblatt & J.C.Manning, indigenous
 Babiana patersoniae L.Bolus, endemic
 Babiana patula N.E.Br. endemic
 Babiana pauciflora G.J.Lewis, endemic
 Babiana petiolata Goldblatt & J.C.Manning, indigenous
 Babiana pilosa G.J.Lewis, endemic
 Babiana planifolia (G.J.Lewis) Goldblatt & J.C.Manning, endemic
 Babiana praemorsa Goldblatt & J.C.Manning, endemic
 Babiana pubescens (Lam.) G.J.Lewis, endemic
 Babiana purpurea Ker Gawl. endemic
 Babiana pygmaea (Burm.f.) Baker, endemic
 Babiana radiata Goldblatt & J.C.Manning, indigenous
 Babiana regia (G.J.Lewis) Goldblatt & J.C.Manning, endemic
 Babiana rigidifolia Goldblatt & J.C.Manning, indigenous
 Babiana ringens (L.) Ker Gawl. indigenous
 Babiana ringens (L.) Ker Gawl. subsp. australis Goldblatt & J.C.Manning, endemic
 Babiana ringens (L.) Ker Gawl. subsp. ringens, endemic
 Babiana rivulicola Goldblatt & J.C.Manning, indigenous
 Babiana rubella Goldblatt & J.C.Manning, indigenous
 Babiana rubrocyanea (Jacq.) Ker Gawl. endemic
 Babiana salteri G.J.Lewis, endemic
 Babiana sambucina (Jacq.) Ker Gawl. indigenous
 Babiana sambucina (Jacq.) Ker Gawl. subsp. longibracteata (G.J.Lewis) Goldblatt & J.C.Manning, endemic
 Babiana sambucina (Jacq.) Ker Gawl. subsp. sambucina, endemic
 Babiana sambucina (Jacq.) Ker Gawl. var. longibracteata G.J.Lewis, accepted as Babiana sambucina (Jacq.) Ker Gawl. subsp. longibracteata (G.J.Lewis) Goldblatt & J.C.Manning
 Babiana sambucina (Jacq.) Ker Gawl. var. undulato-venosa (Klatt) G.J.Lewis, accepted as Babiana sambucina (Jacq.) Ker Gawl. subsp. sambucina, endemic
 Babiana sambucina (Jacq.) Ker Gawl. var. unguiculata G.J.Lewis, accepted as Babiana rigidifolia Goldblatt & J.C.Manning, endemic
 Babiana scabrifolia Brehmer ex Klatt, endemic
 Babiana scabrifolia Brehmer ex Klatt var. acuminata G.J.Lewis, accepted as Babiana scabrifolia Brehmer ex Klatt, endemic
 Babiana scabrifolia Brehmer ex Klatt var. declinata G.J.Lewis, accepted as Babiana scabrifolia Brehmer ex Klatt, endemic
 Babiana scariosa G.J.Lewis, endemic
 Babiana secunda (Thunb.) Ker Gawl. endemic
 Babiana sinuata G.J.Lewis, endemic
 Babiana spathacea (L.f.) Ker Gawl. endemic
 Babiana spiralis Baker, endemic
 Babiana stenomera Schltr. endemic
 Babiana striata (Jacq.) G.J.Lewis, endemic
 Babiana striata (Jacq.) G.J.Lewis var. planifolia G.J.Lewis, accepted as Babiana planifolia (G.J.Lewis) Goldblatt & J.C.Manning
 Babiana stricta (Aiton) Ker Gawl. endemic
 Babiana stricta (Aiton) Ker Gawl. var. erectifolia G.J.Lewis, accepted as Babiana stricta (Aiton) Ker Gawl.
 Babiana stricta (Aiton) Ker Gawl. var. grandiflora G.J.Lewis, accepted as Babiana tubaeformis Goldblatt & J.C.Manning
 Babiana stricta (Aiton) Ker Gawl. var. regia G.J.Lewis, accepted as Babiana regia (G.J.Lewis) Goldblatt & J.C.Manning
 Babiana stricta (Aiton) Ker Gawl. var. sulphurea (Jacq.) Baker, accepted as Babiana sulphurea (Jacq.) Ker Gawl.
 Babiana symmetrantha Goldblatt & J.C.Manning, indigenous
 Babiana tanquana J.C.Manning & Goldblatt, indigenous
 Babiana teretifolia Goldblatt & J.C.Manning, indigenous
 Babiana thunbergii Ker Gawl. accepted as Babiana hirsuta (Lam.) Goldblatt & J.C.Manning, endemic
 Babiana torta G.J.Lewis, endemic
 Babiana toximontana J.C.Manning & Goldblatt, indigenous
 Babiana tritonioides G.J.Lewis, endemic
 Babiana truncata G.J.Lewis, accepted as Babiana flabellifolia Harv. ex Klatt
 Babiana tubaeformis Goldblatt & J.C.Manning, endemic
 Babiana tubiflora (L.f.) Ker Gawl. endemic
 Babiana tubulosa (Burm.f.) Ker Gawl. endemic
 Babiana tubulosa (Burm.f.) Ker Gawl. var. tubiflora (L.f.) G.J.Lewis, accepted as Babiana tubiflora (L.f.) Ker Gawl. endemic
 Babiana unguiculata G.J.Lewis, endemic
 Babiana vanzijliae L.Bolus, endemic
 Babiana villosa (Aiton) Ker Gawl. endemic
 Babiana villosa (Aiton) Ker Gawl. var. grandis G.J.Lewis, accepted as Babiana villosa (Aiton) Ker Gawl. endemic
 Babiana villosula (J.F.Gmel.) Ker Gawl. ex Steud. endemic
 Babiana virescens Goldblatt & J.C.Manning, indigenous
 Babiana virginea Goldblatt, endemic

Barnardiella 
Genus Barnardiella:
 Barnardiella spiralis (N.E.Br.) Goldblatt, accepted as Moraea herrei (L.Bolus) Goldblatt

Belamcanda 
Genus Belamcanda:
 Belamcanda bulbifera (L.) Moench, accepted as Sparaxis bulbifera (L.) Ker Gawl.

Bobartia 
Genus Bobartia:
 Bobartia aphylla (L.f.) Ker Gawl. endemic
 Bobartia fasciculata J.B.Gillett ex Strid, endemic
 Bobartia filiformis (L.f.) Ker Gawl. endemic
 Bobartia gladiata (L.f.) Ker Gawl. indigenous
 Bobartia gladiata (L.f.) Ker Gawl. subsp. gladiata, endemic
 Bobartia gladiata (L.f.) Ker Gawl. subsp. major (G.J.Lewis) Strid, endemic
 Bobartia gladiata (L.f.) Ker Gawl. subsp. teres Strid, endemic
 Bobartia gracilis Baker, endemic
 Bobartia indica L. endemic
 Bobartia lilacina G.J.Lewis, endemic
 Bobartia longicyma J.B.Gillett, indigenous
 Bobartia longicyma J.B.Gillett subsp. longicyma, endemic
 Bobartia longicyma J.B.Gillett subsp. magna J.B.Gillett ex Strid, endemic
 Bobartia longicyma J.B.Gillett subsp. microflora Strid, endemic
 Bobartia macrocarpa Strid, endemic
 Bobartia macrospatha Baker, indigenous
 Bobartia macrospatha Baker subsp. anceps (Baker) Strid, endemic
 Bobartia macrospatha Baker subsp. macrospatha, endemic
 Bobartia orientalis J.B.Gillett, indigenous
 Bobartia orientalis J.B.Gillett subsp. occidentalis Strid, endemic
 Bobartia orientalis J.B.Gillett subsp. orientalis, endemic
 Bobartia paniculata G.J.Lewis, endemic
 Bobartia parva J.B.Gillett, endemic
 Bobartia robusta Baker, endemic
 Bobartia rufa Strid, endemic

Chasmanthe 
Genus Chasmanthe:
 Chasmanthe aethiopica (L.) N.E.Br. endemic
 Chasmanthe bicolor (Gasp.) N.E.Br. endemic
 Chasmanthe floribunda (Salisb.) N.E.Br. endemic
 Chasmanthe floribunda (Salisb.) N.E.Br. var. duckittii G.J.Lewis ex L.Bolus, accepted as Chasmanthe floribunda (Salisb.) N.E.Br.

Codonorhiza 
Genus Codonorhiza:
 Codonorhiza azurea (Eckl. ex Baker) Goldblatt & J.C.Manning, indigenous
 Codonorhiza corymbosa (L.) Goldblatt & J.C.Manning, indigenous
 Codonorhiza elandsmontana Goldblatt & J.C.Manning, indigenous
 Codonorhiza falcata (L.f.) Goldblatt & J.C.Manning, indigenous
 Codonorhiza fastigiata (Lam.) Goldblatt & J.C.Manning, indigenous
 Codonorhiza micrantha (E.Mey. ex Klatt) Goldblatt & J.C.Manning, indigenous
 Codonorhiza pillansii Goldblatt & J.C.Manning, indigenous

Crocosmia 
Genus Crocosmia:
 Crocosmia aurea (Pappe ex Hook.) Planch. indigenous
 Crocosmia aurea (Pappe ex Hook.) Planch. subsp. aurea, indigenous
 Crocosmia aurea (Pappe ex Hook.) Planch. var. maculata Baker, accepted as Crocosmia aurea (Pappe ex Hook.) Planch. subsp. aurea
 Crocosmia fucata (Herb.) M.P.de Vos, endemic
 Crocosmia masoniorum (L.Bolus) N.E.Br. endemic
 Crocosmia mathewsiana (L.Bolus) Goldblatt, endemic
 Crocosmia paniculata (Klatt) Goldblatt, indigenous
 Crocosmia pearsei Oberm. indigenous
 Crocosmia pottsii (McNab ex Baker) N.E.Br. endemic
 Crocosmia rochensis (Ker Gawl.) Klatt, accepted as Ixia bellendenii R.C.Foster, indigenous
 Crocosmia tenuiflora (Vahl) Klatt, accepted as Ixia paniculata D.Delaroche, indigenous

Devia 
Genus Devia:
 Devia xeromorpha Goldblatt & J.C.Manning, endemic

Dierama 
Genus Dierama:
 Dierama adelphicum Hilliard, indigenous
 Dierama ambiguum Hilliard, endemic
 Dierama argyreum L.Bolus, endemic
 Dierama atrum N.E.Br. endemic
 Dierama cooperi N.E.Br. endemic
 Dierama dissimile Hilliard, endemic
 Dierama dracomontanum Hilliard, indigenous
 Dierama dubium N.E.Br. endemic
 Dierama erectum Hilliard, endemic
 Dierama floriferum Hilliard, endemic
 Dierama formosum Hilliard, indigenous
 Dierama galpinii N.E.Br. indigenous
 Dierama gracile N.E.Br. endemic
 Dierama grandiflorum G.J.Lewis, endemic
 Dierama igneum Klatt, endemic
 Dierama insigne N.E.Br. indigenous
 Dierama jucundum Hilliard, indigenous
 Dierama latifolium N.E.Br. endemic
 Dierama luteoalbidum I.Verd. endemic
 Dierama medium N.E.Br. indigenous
 Dierama mobile Hilliard, indigenous
 Dierama mossii (N.E.Br.) Hilliard, indigenous
 Dierama nebrownii Hilliard, endemic
 Dierama nixonianum Hilliard, endemic
 Dierama pallidum Hilliard, endemic
 Dierama palustre N.E.Br. accepted as Dierama latifolium N.E.Br.
 Dierama pauciflorum N.E.Br. indigenous
 Dierama pendulum (L.f.) Baker, endemic
 Dierama pictum N.E.Br. indigenous
 Dierama pulcherrimum (Hook.f.) Baker, endemic
 Dierama pumilum N.E.Br. endemic
 Dierama reynoldsii I.Verd. endemic
 Dierama robustum N.E.Br. indigenous
 Dierama sertum Hilliard, endemic
 Dierama trichorhizum (Baker) N.E.Br. indigenous
 Dierama tyrium Hilliard, endemic
 Dierama tysonii N.E.Br. endemic

Dietes 
Genus Dietes:
 Dietes bicolor (Steud.) Sweet ex Klatt, endemic
 Dietes bicolor (Steud.) Sweet ex Klatt subsp. armeniaca Goldblatt & J.C.Manning, endemic
 Dietes bicolor (Steud.) Sweet ex Klatt subsp. bicolor, endemic
 Dietes butcheriana Gerstner, endemic
 Dietes flavida Oberm. indigenous
 Dietes grandiflora N.E.Br. indigenous
 Dietes iridioides (L.) Sweet ex Klatt, indigenous
 Dietes iridioides (L.) Sweet ex Klatt subsp. iridioides, indigenous

Duthiastrum 
Genus Duthiastrum:
 Duthiastrum linifolium (E.Phillips) M.P.de Vos, endemic

Ferraria 
Genus Ferraria:
 Ferraria antherosa Ker Gawl. accepted as Ferraria variabilis Goldblatt & J.C.Manning, indigenous
 Ferraria brevifolia G.J.Lewis, endemic
 Ferraria crispa Burm. subsp. crispa, accepted as Ferraria crispa Burm. endemic
 Ferraria crispa Burm. subsp. nortieri M.P.de Vos, accepted as Ferraria crispa Burm. endemic
 Ferraria densepunctulata M.P.de Vos, endemic
 Ferraria divaricata Sweet, endemic
 Ferraria ferrariola (Jacq.) Willd. endemic
 Ferraria foliosa G.J.Lewis, endemic
 Ferraria glutinosa (Baker) Rendle, indigenous
 Ferraria kamiesbergensis M.P.de Vos, accepted as Ferraria macrochlamys (Baker) Goldblatt & J.C.Manning subsp. kamiesbergensis (M.P.de Vos) Goldblatt, endemic
 Ferraria macrochlamys (Baker) Goldblatt & J.C.Manning, endemic
 Ferraria macrochlamy (Baker) Goldblatt & J.C.Manning subsp. kamiesbergensis (M.P.de Vos) Goldblatt, endemic
 Ferraria macrochlamys (Baker) Goldblatt & J.C.Manning subsp. macrochlamys, endemic
 Ferraria macrochlamys (Baker) Goldblatt & J.C.Manning subsp. serpentina Goldblatt & J.C.Manning, indigenous
 Ferraria ornata Goldblatt & J.C.Manning, indigenous
 Ferraria ovata (Thunb.) Goldblatt & J.C.Manning, endemic
 Ferraria parva Goldblatt & J.C.Manning, indigenous
 Ferraria schaeferi Dinter, indigenous
 Ferraria uncinata Sweet, endemic
 Ferraria uncinat] Sweet subsp. macrochlamys (Baker) M.P.de Vos, accepted as Ferraria macrochlamys (Baker) Goldblatt & J.C.Manning subsp. macrochlamys
 Ferraria variabilis Goldblatt & J.C.Manning, endemic

Freesia 
Genus Freesia:
 Freesea mineatolateritia Eckl. accepted as Ixia tenuifolia Vahl, indigenous
 Freesia alba (G.L.Mey.) Gumbl. accepted as Freesia leichtlinii Klatt subsp. alba (G.L.Mey.) J.C.Manning & Goldblatt, endemic
 Freesia andersoniae L.Bolus, endemic
 Freesia armstrongii W.Watson, accepted as Freesia corymbosa (Burm.f.) N.E.Br.
 Freesia aurea E.G.Hend. ex Gumbl. accepted as Freesia corymbosa (Burm.f.) N.E.Br.
 Freesia brevis N.E.Br. accepted as Freesia corymbosa (Burm.f.) N.E.Br.
 Freesia caryophyllacea (Burm.f.) N.E.Br. endemic
 Freesia corymbosa (Burm.f.) N.E.Br. endemic
 Freesia corymbosa (Burm.f.) N.E.Br. var. aurea (E.G.Hend. ex Gumbl.) N.E.Br. accepted as Freesia corymbosa (Burm.f.) N.E.Br.
 Freesia elimensis L.Bolus, accepted as Freesia caryophyllacea (Burm.f.) N.E.Br.
 Freesia fergusoniae L.Bolus, endemic
 Freesia flava (N.E.Br.) N.E.Br. accepted as Freesia speciosa L.Bolus
 Freesia framesii L.Bolus, accepted as Freesia occidentalis L.Bolus
 Freesia fucata J.C.Manning & Goldblatt, endemic
 Freesia grandiflora (Baker) Klatt, indigenous
 Freesia grandiflor] (Baker) Klatt subsp. grandiflora, indigenous
 Freesia herbertii Klatt ex N.E.Br. accepted as Freesia caryophyllacea (Burm.f.) N.E.Br.
 Freesia hurlingii L.Bolus, accepted as Freesia refracta (Jacq.) Klatt
 Freesia juncea (Ker Gawl.) Klatt, accepted as Freesia verrucosa (B.Vogel) Goldblatt & J.C.Manning
 Freesia lactea Fenzl ex N.E.Br. accepted as Freesia leichtlinii Klatt subsp. alba (G.L.Mey.) J.C.Manning & Goldblatt
 Freesia laxa (Thunb.) Goldblatt & J.C.Manning, indigenous
 Freesia laxa (Thunb.) Goldblatt & J.C.Manning subsp. azurea (Goldblatt & Hutchings) Goldblatt & J.C. indigenous
 Freesia laxa (Thunb.) Goldblatt & J.C.Manning subsp. laxa, indigenous
 Freesia leichtlinii Klatt, accepted as Freesia leichtlinii Klatt subsp. leichtlinii, endemic
 Freesia marginata J.C.Manning & Goldblatt, endemic
 Freesia metelerkampiae L.Bolus, accepted as Freesia corymbosa (Burm.f.) N.E.Br.
 Freesia middlemostii W.F.Barker, accepted as Freesia leichtlinii Klatt subsp. leichtlinii
 Freesia muirii N.E.Br. accepted as Freesia leichtlinii Klatt subsp. leichtlinii
 Freesia occidentalis L.Bolus, endemic
 Freesia odorota Eckl. ex Klatt, accepted as Freesia corymbosa (Burm.f.) N.E.Br.
 Freesia parva N.E.Br. accepted as Freesia caryophyllacea (Burm.f.) N.E.Br.
 Freesia picta N.E.Br. accepted as Freesia leichtlinii Klatt subsp. alba (G.L.Mey.) J.C.Manning & Goldblatt
 Freesia praecox J.C.Manning & Goldblatt, indigenous
 Freesia refracta (Jacq.) Klatt, endemic
 Freesia refracta (Jacq.) Klatt var. alba G.L.Mey. accepted as Freesia leichtlinii Klatt subsp. alba (G.L.Mey.) J.C.Manning & Goldblatt
 Freesia refracta (Jacq.) Klatt var. odorata (Eckl. ex Klatt) Baker, accepted as Freesia corymbosa (Burm.f.) N.E.Br.
 Freesia sparrmanii (Thunb.) N.E.Br. endemic
 Freesia sparrmanii (Thunb.) N.E.Br. var. alba (G.L.Mey.) N.E.Br. accepted as Freesia leichtlinii Klatt subsp. alba (G.L.Mey.) J.C.Manning & Goldblatt
 Freesia sparrmannii (Thunb.) N.E.Br. var. flava N.E.Br. accepted as Freesia speciosa L.Bolus
 Freesia speciosa L.Bolus, endemic
 Freesia verrucosa (B.Vogel) Goldblatt & J.C.Manning, endemic
 Freesia viridis (Aiton) Goldblatt & J.C.Manning, indigenous
 Freesia viridis (Aiton) Goldblatt & J.C.Manning subsp. viridis, endemic
 Freesia xanthospila (DC.) Klatt, accepted as Freesia caryophyllacea (Burm.f.) N.E.Br.

Galaxia 
Genus Galaxia:
 Galaxia alata Goldblatt. accepted as Moraea angulata Goldblatt
 Galaxia albiflora G.J.Lewis. accepted as Moraea albiflora (G.J.Lewis) Goldblatt
 Galaxia barnardii Goldblatt. accepted as Moraea barnardiella Goldblatt
 Galaxia ciliata Pers. accepted as Moraea pilifolia Goldblatt
 Galaxia citrina G.J.Lewis. accepted as Moraea citrina (G.J.Lewis) Goldblatt
 Galaxia fenestralis Goldblatt & E.G.H.Oliv. accepted as Moraea fenestralis (Goldblatt & E.G.H.Oliv.) Goldblatt
 Galaxia fugacissima (L.f.) Druce. accepted as Moraea fugacissima (L.f.) Goldblatt
 Galaxia grandiflora Andrews. accepted as Moraea kamiesensis Goldblatt
 Galaxia ixiiflora DC. accepted as Ixia monadelpha D.Delaroche.indigenous
 Galaxia kamiesmontana Goldblatt. accepted as Moraea kamiesmontana (Goldblatt) Goldblatt
 Galaxia luteoalba Goldblatt. accepted as Moraea luteoalba (Goldblatt) Goldblatt
 Galaxia ovata Thunb. accepted as Moraea galaxia (L.f.) Goldblatt & J.C.Manning
 Galaxia parva Goldblatt. accepted as Moraea minima Goldblatt
 Galaxia plicata Jacq. accepted as Lapeirousia plicata (Jacq.) Diels subsp. plicata
 Galaxia ramosa DC. accepted as Ixia monadelpha D.Delaroche. indigenous
 Galaxia stagnalis Goldblatt. accepted as Moraea stagnalis (Goldblatt) Goldblatt
 Galaxia variabilis G.J.Lewis. accepted as Moraea variabilis (G.J.Lewis) Goldblatt
 Galaxia versicolor Salisb. ex Klatt. accepted as Moraea versicolor (Salisb. ex Klatt) Goldblatt

Geissorhiza 
Genus Geissorhiza:
 Geissorhiza alticola Goldblatt. endemic
 Geissorhiza altimontana Goldblatt & J.C.Manning. endemic
 Geissorhiza arenicola Goldblatt. endemic
 Geissorhiza aspera Goldblatt. endemic
 Geissorhiza barkerae Goldblatt. endemic
 Geissorhiza bolusii Baker. endemic
 Geissorhiza bonaspei Goldblatt. endemic
 Geissorhiza bracteata Klatt. endemic
 Geissorhiza brehmii Eckl. ex Klatt. endemic
 Geissorhiza brevituba (G.J.Lewis) Goldblatt. endemic
 Geissorhiza bryicola Goldblatt. endemic
 Geissorhiza burchellii R.C.Foster. endemic
 Geissorhiza callista Goldblatt. endemic
 Geissorhiza cantharophila Goldblatt & J.C.Manning. endemic
 Geissorhiza cataractarum Goldblatt. endemic
 Geissorhiza cedarmontana Goldblatt. endemic
 Geissorhiza ciliatula Goldblatt. endemic
 Geissorhiza confusa Goldblatt. endemic
 Geissorhiza corrugata Klatt. endemic
 Geissorhiza darlingensis Goldblatt. endemic
 Geissorhiza delicatula Goldblatt. endemic
 Geissorhiza demissa Goldblatt & J.C.Manning. endemic
 Geissorhiza divaricata Goldblatt. endemic
 Geissorhiza elsiae Goldblatt. endemic
 Geissorhiza erosa (Salisb.) R.C.Foster. endemic
 Geissorhiza erubescens Goldblatt. endemic
 Geissorhiza esterhuyseniae Goldblatt. endemic
 Geissorhiza eurystigma L.Bolus. endemic
 Geissorhiza exilis Goldblatt & J.C.Manning. endemic
 Geissorhiza exscapa (Thunb.) Goldblatt. endemic
 Geissorhiza foliosa Klatt. endemic
 Geissorhiza fourcadei (L.Bolus) G.J.Lewis. endemic
 Geissorhiza furva Ker Gawl. ex Baker. endemic
 Geissorhiza geminata E.Mey. ex Baker. endemic
 Geissorhiza grandiflora Goldblatt. endemic
 Geissorhiza helmei Goldblatt & J.C.Manning. endemic
 Geissorhiza hesperanthoides Schltr. endemic
 Geissorhiza heterostyla L.Bolus. endemic
 Geissorhiza heterostyla L.Bolus subsp. heterostyla. endemic
 Geissorhiza heterostyla L.Bolus subsp. rosea (Klatt) Goldblatt & J.C.Manning. endemic
 Geissorhiza hispidula (R.C.Foster) Goldblatt. endemic
 Geissorhiza humilis (Thunb.) Ker Gawl. endemic
 Geissorhiza imbricata (D.Delaroche) Ker Gawl. indigenous
 Geissorhiza imbricata (D.Delaroche) Ker Gawl. subsp. bicolor (Thunb.) Goldblatt. endemic
 Geissorhiza imbricata (D.Delaroche) Ker Gawl. subsp. imbricata. endemic
 Geissorhiza inaequalis L.Bolus. endemic
 Geissorhiza inconspicua Baker. endemic
 Geissorhiza inflexa (D.Delaroche) Ker Gawl. endemic
 Geissorhiza intermedia Goldblatt. endemic
 Geissorhiza ixioides Schltr. endemic
 Geissorhiza juncea (Link) A.Dietr. endemic
 Geissorhiza kamiesmontana Goldblatt. endemic
 Geissorhiza karooica Goldblatt. endemic
 Geissorhiza lapidosa Goldblatt & J.C.Manning. endemic
 Geissorhiza latifolia (D.Delaroche) Baker. accepted as Ixia latifolia D.Delaroche.indigenous
 Geissorhiza leipoldtii R.C.Foster. endemic
 Geissorhiza lewisiae R.C.Foster. endemic
 Geissorhiza lithicola Goldblatt. endemic
 Geissorhiza longifolia (G.J.Lewis) Goldblatt. endemic
 Geissorhiza louisabolusiae R.C.Foster. endemic
 Geissorhiza lutea Eckl. accepted as Hesperantha falcata (L.f.) Ker Gawl. subsp. lutea (Benth. ex Baker) Goldblatt & J.C.Manning.
 Geissorhiza malmesburiensis R.C.Foster. endemic
 Geissorhiza mathewsii L.Bolus. endemic
 Geissorhiza melanthera Goldblatt & J.C.Manning.indigenous
 Geissorhiza minuta Goldblatt. endemic
 Geissorhiza monanthos Eckl. endemic
 Geissorhiza monticola Goldblatt & J.C.Manning. endemic
 Geissorhiza namaquamontana Goldblatt & J.C.Manning. endemic
 Geissorhiza namaquensis W.F.Barker. endemic
 Geissorhiza nana Klatt. endemic
 Geissorhiza nigromontana Goldblatt. endemic
 Geissorhiza nubigena Goldblatt. endemic
 Geissorhiza nutans Goldblatt & J.C.Manning. endemic
 Geissorhiza ornithogaloides Klatt.indigenous
 Geissorhiza ornithogaloides Klatt subsp. marlothii (R.C.Foster) Goldblatt. endemic
 Geissorhiza ornithogaloides Klatt subsp. ornithogaloides, endemic
 Geissorhiza outeniquensis Goldblatt. endemic
 Geissorhiza ovalifolia R.C.Foster. endemic
 Geissorhiza ovata (Burm.f.) Asch. & Graebn. endemic
 Geissorhiza pappei Baker. endemic
 Geissorhiza parva Baker. endemic
 Geissorhiza platystigma Goldblatt & J.C.Manning. endemic
 Geissorhiza pseudinaequalis Goldblatt. endemic
 Geissorhiza purpurascens Goldblatt. endemic
 Geissorhiza purpureolutea Baker. endemic
 Geissorhiza pusilla (Andrews) Klatt. endemic
 Geissorhiza radians (Thunb.) Goldblatt. endemic
 Geissorhiza ramosa Ker Gawl. ex Klatt. endemic
 Geissorhiza reclinata Goldblatt & J.C.Manning. endemic
 Geissorhiza roseoalba (G.J.Lewis) Goldblatt. endemic
 Geissorhiza rupicola Goldblatt & J.C.Manning. endemic
 Geissorhiza saxicola Goldblatt & J.C.Manning. endemic
 Geissorhiza schinzii (Baker) Goldblatt. endemic
 Geissorhiza scillaris A.Dietr. endemic
 Geissorhiza scopulosa Goldblatt. endemic
 Geissorhiza setacea (Thunb.) Ker Gawl. endemic
 Geissorhiza silenoides Goldblatt & J.C.Manning. endemic
 Geissorhiza similis Goldblatt. endemic
 Geissorhiza spiralis (Burch.) M.P.de Vos ex Goldblatt. endemic
 Geissorhiza splendidissima Diels. endemic
 Geissorhiza stenosiphon Goldblatt. endemic
 Geissorhiza subrigida L.Bolus. endemic
 Geissorhiza sufflava Goldblatt & J.C.Manning. endemic
 Geissorhiza sulphurascens Schltr. ex R.C.Foster. endemic
 Geissorhiza tabularis Goldblatt. endemic
 Geissorhiza tenella Goldblatt. endemic
 Geissorhiza tricolor Goldblatt & J.C.Manning. endemic
 Geissorhiza tulbaghensis F.Bolus. endemic
 Geissorhiza uliginosa Goldblatt & J.C.Manning. endemic
 Geissorhiza umbrosa G.J.Lewis. endemic
 Geissorhiza unifolia Goldblatt. endemic

Gladiolus 
Genus Gladiolus:
 Gladiolus abbreviatus Andrews. endemic
 Gladiolus acuminatus F.Bolus. endemic
 Gladiolus alatus L. endemic
 Gladiolus alatus L. var. algoensis Herb. accepted as Gladiolus alatus L.
 Gladiolus alatus L. var. meliusculus G.J.Lewis. accepted as Gladiolus meliusculus (G.J.Lewis) Goldblatt & J.C.Manning
 Gladiolus alatus L. var. pulcherrimus G.J.Lewis. accepted as Gladiolus pulcherrimus (G.J.Lewis) Goldblatt & J.C.Manning
 Gladiolus alatus L. var. speciosus (Thunb.) G.J.Lewis. accepted as Gladiolus speciosus Thunb.
 Gladiolus albens Goldblatt & J.C.Manning. endemic
 Gladiolus amabilis Salisb. accepted as Freesia verrucosa (B.Vogel) Goldblatt & J.C.Manning
 Gladiolus anceps L.f. accepted as Lapeirousia anceps (L.f.) Ker Gawl
 Gladiolus angustus L. endemic
 Gladiolus antholyzoides Baker. endemic
 Gladiolus appendiculatus G.J.Lewis. indigenous
 Gladiolus appendiculatus G.J.Lewis var. longifolius G.J.Lewis. accepted as Gladiolus appendiculatus G.J.Lewis
 Gladiolus aquamontanus Goldblatt. endemic
 Gladiolus arcuatus Klatt. endemic
 Gladiolus atropictus Goldblatt & J.C.Manning. endemic
 Gladiolus aurantiacus Klatt. indigenous
 Gladiolus aureus Baker. endemic
 Gladiolus bilineatus G.J.Lewis. endemic
 Gladiolus blommesteinii L.Bolus. endemic
 Gladiolus bonaspei Goldblatt & M.P.de Vos. accepted as Gladiolus merianellus (L.) Thunb. endemic
 Gladiolus brachyphyllus F.Bolus.indigenous
 Gladiolus bracteatus Thunb. accepted as Lapeirousia pyramidalis (Lam.) Goldblatt subsp. pyramidalis
 Gladiolus brevifolius Jacq. endemic
 Gladiolus brevifolius Jacq. var. minor G.J.Lewis. accepted as Gladiolus brevifolius Jacq.
 Gladiolus brevifolius Jacq. var. obscurus G.J.Lewis. accepted as Gladiolus brevifolius Jacq.
 Gladiolus brevifolius Jacq. var. robustus G.J.Lewis. accepted as Gladiolus brevifolius Jacq.
 Gladiolus brevitubus G.J.Lewis. endemic
 Gladiolus buckerveldii (L.Bolus) Goldblatt. endemic
 Gladiolus bullatus Thunb. ex G.J.Lewis. endemic
 Gladiolus caeruleus Goldblatt & J.C.Manning. endemic
 Gladiolus calcaratus G.J.Lewis. endemic
 Gladiolus cardinalis Curtis. endemic
 Gladiolus carinatus Aiton. endemic
 Gladiolus carinatus Aiton subsp. parviflorus G.J.Lewis. accepted as Gladiolus griseus Goldblatt & J.C.Manning
 Gladiolus carmineus C.H.Wright. endemic
 Gladiolus carneus D.Delaroche. endemic
 Gladiolus caryophyllaceus (Burm.f.) Poir. endemic
 Gladiolus cataractarum Oberm. endemic
 Gladiolus ceresianus L.Bolus. endemic
 Gladiolus citrinus Klatt. accepted as Gladiolus trichonemifolius Ker Gawl.
 Gladiolus coccineus (Thunb.) Schrank. accepted as Ixia campanulata Houtt. indigenous
 Gladiolus comptonii G.J.Lewis. endemic
 Gladiolus corymbosa Burm.f. accepted as Freesia corymbosa (Burm.f.) N. e.Br.
 Gladiolus crassifolius Baker. indigenous
 Gladiolus crispulatus L.Bolus. endemic
 Gladiolus cruentus T.Moore. endemic
 Gladiolus cunonius (L.) Gaertn. endemic
 Gladiolus cylindraceus G.J.Lewis. endemic
 Gladiolus dalenii Van Geel.indigenous
 Gladiolus dalenii Van Geel subsp. dalenii, indigenous
 Gladiolus debilis Sims. endemic
 Gladiolus debilis Sims var. cochleatus (Sweet) G.J.Lewis. accepted as Gladiolus debilis Sims
 Gladiolus debilis Sims var. variegatus G.J.Lewis. accepted as Gladiolus variegatus (G.J.Lewis) Goldblatt & J.C.Manning
 Gladiolus delpierrei Goldblatt. endemic
 Gladiolus densiflorus Baker, indigenous
 Gladiolus deserticola Goldblatt. endemic
 Gladiolus dolichosiphon Goldblatt & J.C.Manning. endemic
 Gladiolus dolomiticus Oberm. endemic
 Gladiolus ecklonii Lehm. indigenous
 Gladiolus ecklonii Lehm. subsp. rehmannii (Baker) Oberm. accepted as Gladiolus rehmannii Baker
 Gladiolus ecklonii Lehm. subsp. vinosomaculatus (Kies) Oberm. accepted as Gladiolus vinosomaculatus Kies
 Gladiolus elliotii Baker, indigenous
 Gladiolus emiliae L.Bolus. endemic
 Gladiolus engysiphon G.J.Lewis. endemic
 Gladiolus equitans Thunb. endemic
 Gladiolus excisus Jacq. accepted as Freesia verrucosa (B.Vogel) Goldblatt & J.C.Manning
 Gladiolus exiguus G.J.Lewis. endemic
 Gladiolus exilis G.J.Lewis. endemic
 Gladiolus falcatus L.f. accepted as Codonorhiza falcata (L.f.) Goldblatt & J.C.Manning
 Gladiolus ferrugineus Goldblatt & J.C.Manning. indigenous
 Gladiolus filiformis Goldblatt & J.C.Manning. endemic
 Gladiolus fissifolius Jacq. accepted as Lapeirousia pyramidalis (Lam.) Goldblatt subsp. pyramidalis
 Gladiolus flanaganii Baker. indigenous
 Gladiolus floribundus Jacq. endemic
 Gladiolus floribundus Jacq. subsp. fasciatus (Roem. & Schult.) Oberm. accepted as Gladiolus grandiflorus Andrews
 Gladiolus floribundus Jacq. subsp. milleri (Ker Gawl.) Oberm. accepted as Gladiolus grandiflorus Andrews
 Gladiolus floribundus Jacq. subsp. miniatus (Eckl.) Oberm. accepted as Gladiolus miniatus Eckl.
 Gladiolus floribundus Jacq. subsp. rudis (Licht. ex Roem. & Schult.) Oberm. accepted as Gladiolus rudis Licht. ex Roem. & Schult.
 Gladiolus fourcadei (L.Bolus) Goldblatt & M.P.de Vos. endemic
 Gladiolus geardii L.Bolus. endemic
 Gladiolus gracilis Jacq. endemic
 Gladiolus gracilis Jacq. var. latifolius G.J.Lewis. accepted as Gladiolus caeruleus Goldblatt & J.C.Manning
 Gladiolus grandiflorus Andrews. endemic
 Gladiolus griseus Goldblatt & J.C.Manning. endemic
 Gladiolus gueinzii Kunze. endemic
 Gladiolus guthriei F.Bolus. endemic
 Gladiolus halophila Goldblatt & J.C.Manning. accepted as Gladiolus diluvialis Goldblatt & J.C.Manning
 Gladiolus hirsutus Jacq. endemic
 Gladiolus hollandii L.Bolus.indigenous
 Gladiolus huttonii (N. e.Br.) Goldblatt & M.P.de Vos. endemic
 Gladiolus hyalinus Jacq. endemic
 Gladiolus inandensis Baker. endemic
 Gladiolus inflatus Thunb. endemic
 Gladiolus inflatus Thunb. subsp. intermedius G.J.Lewis. accepted as Gladiolus patersoniae F.Bolus
 Gladiolus inflatus Thunb. var. louiseae (L.Bolus) Oberm. accepted as Gladiolus inflatus Thunb.
 Gladiolus inflexus Goldblatt & J.C.Manning. endemic
 Gladiolus insolens Goldblatt & J.C.Manning. endemic
 Gladiolus invenustus G.J.Lewis. accepted as Gladiolus densiflorus Baker
 Gladiolus involutus D.Delaroche. endemic
 Gladiolus ixioides Thunb. accepted as Ixia paniculata D.Delaroche.indigenous
 Gladiolus jonquilliodorus Eckl. ex G.J.Lewis. endemic
 Gladiolus junceus L.f. accepted as Freesia verrucosa (B.Vogel) Goldblatt & J.C.Manning
 Gladiolus kamiesbergensis G.J.Lewis. endemic
 Gladiolus karooicus Goldblatt & J.C.Manning. endemic
 Gladiolus lapeirousioides Goldblatt. endemic
 Gladiolus laxus Thunb. accepted as Freesia laxa (Thunb.) Goldblatt & J.C.Manning subsp. laxa
 Gladiolus leptosiphon F.Bolus. endemic
 Gladiolus lewisiae Oberm. endemic
 Gladiolus liliaceus Houtt. endemic
 Gladiolus lineatus Salisb. accepted as Tritonia gladiolaris (Lam.) Goldblatt & J.C.Manning, indigenous
 Gladiolus longicollis Baker, indigenous
 Gladiolus longicollis Baker subsp. longicollis, indigenous
 Gladiolus longicollis Baker subsp. platypetalus (Baker) Goldblatt & J.C.Manning. indigenous
 Gladiolus longicollis Baker var. platypetalus (Baker) Oberm. accepted as Gladiolus longicollis Baker subsp. platypetalus (Baker) Goldblatt & J.C.Manning
 Gladiolus longiflorus (P.J.Bergius) Jacq. accepted as Ixia paniculata D.Delaroche, indigenous
 Gladiolus loteniensis Hilliard & B.L.Burtt. endemic
 Gladiolus macneilii Oberm. endemic
 Gladiolus maculatus Sweet. endemic
 Gladiolus maculatus Sweet subsp. eburneus Oberm. accepted as Gladiolus albens Goldblatt & J.C.Manning
 Gladiolus maculatus Sweet subsp. hibernus (Ingram) Oberm. accepted as Gladiolus maculatus Sweet
 Gladiolus maculatus Sweet subsp. meridionalis (G.J.Lewis) Oberm. accepted as Gladiolus meridionalis G.J.Lewis
 Gladiolus malvinus Goldblatt & J.C.Manning. endemic
 Gladiolus marlothii G.J.Lewis. endemic
 Gladiolus martleyi L.Bolus. endemic
 Gladiolus meliusculus (G.J.Lewis) Goldblatt & J.C.Manning. endemic
 Gladiolus merianellus (L.) Thunb. endemic
 Gladiolus meridionalis G.J.Lewis. endemic
 Gladiolus microcarpus G.J.Lewis. endemic
 Gladiolus microcarpus G.J.Lewis subsp. italaensis Oberm. accepted as Gladiolus scabridus Goldblatt & J.C.Manning
 Gladiolus miniatus Eckl. endemic
 Gladiolus monticola G.J.Lewis ex Goldblatt & J.C.Manning. endemic
 Gladiolus mortonius Herb. endemic
 Gladiolus mostertiae L.Bolus. endemic
 Gladiolus mutabilis G.J.Lewis. endemic
 Gladiolus nerineoides G.J.Lewis. endemic
 Gladiolus nigromontanus Goldblatt. endemic
 Gladiolus oatesii Rolfe, indigenous
 Gladiolus ochroleucus Baker, indigenous
 Gladiolus ochroleucus Baker var. macowanii (Baker) Oberm. accepted as Gladiolus mortonius Herb.
 Gladiolus odoratus L.Bolus. accepted as Gladiolus guthriei F.Bolus
 Gladiolus oppositiflorus Herb. endemic
 Gladiolus oppositiflorus Herb. subsp. salmoneus (Baker) Oberm. accepted as Gladiolus oppositiflorus Herb.
 Gladiolus orchidiflorus Andrews, indigenous
 Gladiolus oreocharis Schltr. endemic
 Gladiolus ornatus Klatt. endemic
 Gladiolus overbergensis Goldblatt & M.P.de Vos. endemic
 Gladiolus paludosus Baker, indigenous
 Gladiolus paniculatus Pers. accepted as Freesia verrucosa (B.Vogel) Goldblatt & J.C.Manning
 Gladiolus papilio Hook.f. indigenous
 Gladiolus pappei Baker, endemic
 Gladiolus pardalinus Goldblatt & J.C.Manning, endemic
 Gladiolus parvulus Schltr, indigenous
 Gladiolus patersoniae F.Bolus. endemic
 Gladiolus pavonia Goldblatt & J.C.Manning. endemic
 Gladiolus permeabilis D.Delaroche, indigenous
 Gladiolus permeabilis D.Delaroche subsp. edulis (Burch. ex Ker Gawl.) Oberm, indigenous
 Gladiolus permeabilis D.Delaroche subsp. permeabilis, endemic
 Gladiolus permeabilis D.Delaroche subsp. wilsonii (Baker) G.J.Lewis. accepted as Gladiolus wilsonii (Baker) Goldblatt & J.C.Manning
 Gladiolus phoenix Goldblatt & J.C.Manning. endemic
 Gladiolus pillansii G.J.Lewis var. pillansii, accepted as Gladiolus martleyi L.Bolus
 Gladiolus pillansii G.J.Lewis var. roseus G.J.Lewis. accepted as Gladiolus martleyi L.Bolus
 Gladiolus pole-evansii I.Verd. endemic
 Gladiolus polystachyus Andr. accepted as Freesia verrucosa (B.Vogel) Goldblatt & J.C.Manning
 Gladiolus pretoriensis Kuntze. endemic
 Gladiolus priorii (N. e.Br.) Goldblatt & M.P.de Vos. endemic
 Gladiolus pritzelii Diels. endemic
 Gladiolus pritzelii Diels var. sufflavus G.J.Lewis. accepted as Gladiolus sufflavus (G.J.Lewis) Goldblatt & J.C.Manning
 Gladiolus psittacinus Hook.f. accepted as Gladiolus dalenii Van Geel subsp. dalenii
 Gladiolus pubigerus G.J.Lewis.indigenous
 Gladiolus pulchellus Salisb. accepted as Freesia verrucosa (B.Vogel) Goldblatt & J.C.Manning
 Gladiolus pulcherrimus (G.J.Lewis) Goldblatt & J.C.Manning. endemic
 Gladiolus punctulatus Schrank var. autumnalis G.J.Lewis. accepted as Gladiolus hirsutus Jacq.
 Gladiolus punctulatus Schrank var. punctulatus, accepted as Gladiolus hirsutus Jacq.
 Gladiolus pyramidalis Burm.f. accepted as Ixia patens Aiton, indigenous
 Gladiolus quadrangularis (Burm.f.) Ker Gawl. endemic
 Gladiolus quadrangulus (D.Delaroche) Barnard. endemic
 Gladiolus ramosus L. accepted as Ixia scillaris L. subsp. scillaris, indigenous
 Gladiolus recurvus L. endemic
 Gladiolus refractus Jacq. accepted as Freesia refracta (Jacq.) Klatt
 Gladiolus reginae Goldblatt & J.C.Manning. endemic
 Gladiolus rehmannii Baker, indigenous
 Gladiolus resupinatus Pers. accepted as Freesia refracta (Jacq.) Klatt.
 Gladiolus rhodanthus J.C.Manning & Goldblatt. endemic
 Gladiolus robertsoniae F.Bolus. endemic
 Gladiolus robustus Goldblatt. accepted as Gladiolus geardii L.Bolus
 Gladiolus rogersii Baker. endemic
 Gladiolus rogersii Baker var. graminifolius G.J.Lewis. accepted as Gladiolus rogersii Baker
 Gladiolus rogersii Baker var. vlokii Goldblatt. accepted as Gladiolus rogersii Baker
 Gladiolus roseovenosus Goldblatt & J.C.Manning. endemic
 Gladiolus rudis Licht. ex Roem. & Schult. endemic
 Gladiolus rufomarginatus G.J.Lewis. endemic
 Gladiolus saccatus (Klatt) Goldblatt & M.P.de Vos, indigenous
 Gladiolus saccatus (Klatt) Goldblatt & M.P.de Vos subsp. steingroeveri (Klatt) Goldblatt & M.P.de Vos, accepted as Gladiolus saccatus (Klatt) Goldblatt & M.P.de Vos
 Gladiolus salteri G.J.Lewis. endemic
 Gladiolus saundersii Hook.f.indigenous
 Gladiolus saxatilis Goldblatt & J.C.Manning. endemic
 Gladiolus scabridus Goldblatt & J.C.Manning, indigenous
 Gladiolus scullyi Baker. endemic
 Gladiolus sekukuniensis P.J.D.Winter. endemic
 Gladiolus sempervirens G.J.Lewis. endemic
 Gladiolus sericeovillosus Hook.f. indigenous
 Gladiolus sericeovillosus Hook.f. forma calvatus (Baker) Oberm. accepted as Gladiolus sericeovillosus Hook.f. subsp. calvatus (Baker) Goldblatt
 Gladiolus sericeovillosus Hook.f. subsp. calvatus (Baker) Goldblatt, indigenous
 Gladiolus sericeovillosus Hook.f. subsp. sericeovillosus, indigenous
 Gladiolus serpenticola Goldblatt & J.C.Manning, indigenous
 Gladiolus setifolius L.f. accepted as Lapeirousia divaricata Baker
 Gladiolus silenoides Jacq. accepted as Lapeirousia silenoides (Jacq.) Ker Gawl.
 Gladiolus sparrmanii (Thunb.) N. e.Br. accepted as Freesia sparrmanii (Thunb.) N. e.Br.
 Gladiolus speciosus Thunb. endemic
 Gladiolus splendens (Sweet) Herb. endemic
 Gladiolus stefaniae Oberm. endemic
 Gladiolus stellatus G.J.Lewis. endemic
 Gladiolus stokoei G.J.Lewis. endemic
 Gladiolus subcaeruleus G.J.Lewis. endemic
 Gladiolus sufflavus (G.J.Lewis) Goldblatt & J.C.Manning. endemic
 Gladiolus symonsii F.Bolus.indigenous
 Gladiolus taubertianus Schltr. endemic
 Gladiolus tenellus Jacq. accepted as Gladiolus carinatus Aiton
 Gladiolus teretifolius Goldblatt & M.P.de Vos. endemic
 Gladiolus trichonemifolius Ker Gawl. endemic
 Gladiolus tristis L. endemic
 Gladiolus tristis L. var. aestivalis (Ingram) G.J.Lewis. accepted as Gladiolus tristis L.
 Gladiolus tristis L. var. concolor (Salisb.) Baker. accepted as Gladiolus tristis L.
 Gladiolus uitenhagensis Goldblatt & Vlok. endemic
 Gladiolus umbellatus Schrank. accepted as Ixia dubia Vent, indigenous
 Gladiolus undulatus L. endemic
 Gladiolus uysiae L.Bolus ex G.J.Lewis. endemic
 Gladiolus vaginatus F.Bolus. endemic
 Gladiolus vaginatus F.Bolus subsp. subtilis Oberm. accepted as Gladiolus vaginatus F.Bolus
 Gladiolus vandermerwei (L.Bolus) Goldblatt & M.P.de Vos. endemic
 Gladiolus variegatus (G.J.Lewis) Goldblatt & J.C.Manning. endemic
 Gladiolus varius F.Bolus, indigenous
 Gladiolus varius F.Bolus var. micranthus (Baker) Oberm. accepted as Gladiolus ferrugineus Goldblatt & J.C.Manning
 Gladiolus venustus G.J.Lewis. endemic
 Gladiolus vernus Oberm, indigenous
 Gladiolus vigilans Barnard. endemic
 Gladiolus vinosomaculatus Kies. endemic
 Gladiolus violaceolineatus G.J.Lewis. endemic
 Gladiolus virescens]] Thunb. endemic
 Gladiolus virescens Thunb. var. lepidus G.J.Lewis. accepted as Gladiolus virescens Thunb.
 Gladiolus virescens Thunb. var. roseovenosus G.J.Lewis. accepted as Gladiolus virescens Thunb.
 Gladiolus virgatus Goldblatt & J.C.Manning. endemic
 Gladiolus viridiflorus G.J.Lewis. endemic
 Gladiolus viridis Aiton. accepted as Freesia viridis (Aiton) Goldblatt & J.C.Manning subsp. viridis
 Gladiolus watermeyeri L.Bolus. endemic
 Gladiolus watsonius Thunb. endemic
 Gladiolus watsonius Thunb. var. maculosus M.P.de Vos & Goldblatt. accepted as Gladiolus watsonius Thunb.
 Gladiolus wilsonii (Baker) Goldblatt & J.C.Manning. endemic
 Gladiolus woodii Baker, indigenous
 Gladiolus xanthospilus DC. accepted as Freesia caryophyllacea (Burm.f.) N. e.Br.

Gynandriris 
Genus Gynandriris:
 Gynandriris anomala Goldblatt. accepted as Moraea contorta Goldblatt
 Gynandriris australis Goldblatt. accepted as Moraea australis (Goldblatt) Goldblatt
 Gynandriris cedarmontana Goldblatt. accepted as Moraea cedarmontana (Goldblatt) Goldblatt
 Gynandriris hesperantha Goldblatt. accepted as Moraea hesperantha (Goldblatt) Goldblatt
 Gynandriris pritzeliana (Diels) Goldblatt. accepted as Moraea pritzeliana Diels
 Gynandriris setifolia (L.f.) R.C.Foster. accepted as Moraea setifolia (L.f.) Druce
 Gynandriris simulans (Baker) R.C.Foster. accepted as Moraea simulans Baker

Hesperantha 
Genus Hesperantha:
 Hesperantha acuta  (Licht. ex Roem. & Schult.) Ker Gawl. endemic
 Hesperantha acuta  (Licht. ex Roem. & Schult.) Ker Gawl. subsp. acuta, endemic
 Hesperantha acuta  (Licht. ex Roem. & Schult.) Ker Gawl. subsp. tugwelliae (R.C.Foster) Goldblatt & J, endemic
 Hesperantha alborosea  Hilliard & B.L.Burtt, endemic
 Hesperantha altimontana  Goldblatt, indigenous
 Hesperantha bachmannii  Baker, endemic
 Hesperantha baurii  Baker, indigenous
 Hesperantha baurii  Baker subsp. baurii, indigenous
 Hesperantha baurii  Baker subsp. formosa Hilliard & B.L.Burtt, indigenous
 Hesperantha bracteolata  R.C.Foster, accepted as Hesperantha pilosa  (L.f.) Ker Gawl. subsp. bracteolata (R.C.Foster) Goldblatt & J.C.Manning
 Hesperantha brevicaulis  (Baker) G.J.Lewis, endemic
 Hesperantha brevifolia  Goldblatt, endemic
 Hesperantha brevistyla  Goldblatt, indigenous
 Hesperantha bulbifera  Baker, endemic
 Hesperantha candida  Baker, indigenous
 Hesperantha cedarmontana  Goldblatt, endemic
 Hesperantha ciliolata  Goldblatt, accepted as Hesperantha pilosa  (L.f.) Ker Gawl. subsp. bracteolata (R.C.Foster) Goldblatt & J.C.Manning, endemic
 Hesperantha coccinea  (Backh. & Harv.) Goldblatt & J.C.Manning, indigenous
 Hesperantha cucullata  Klatt, endemic
 Hesperantha curvula  Hilliard & B.L.Burtt, endemic
 Hesperantha debilis  Goldblatt, endemic
 Hesperantha decipiens  Goldblatt, endemic
 Hesperantha discolor  N.E.Br. accepted as Hesperantha acuta  (Licht. ex Roem. & Schult.) Ker Gawl. subsp. acuta
 Hesperantha dolomitica  Goldblatt & J.C.Manning, indigenous
 Hesperantha elsiae  Goldblatt, endemic
 Hesperantha erecta  (Baker) Benth. ex Baker, endemic
 Hesperantha eremophila  Goldblatt & J.C.Manning, endemic
 Hesperantha falcata  (L.f.) Ker Gawl. endemic
 Hesperantha falcata  (L.f.) Ker Gawl. subsp. falcata, endemic
 Hesperantha falcata  (L.f.) Ker Gawl. subsp. lutea (Benth. ex Baker) Goldblatt & J.C.Manning, endemic
 Hesperantha fibrosa  Baker, endemic
 Hesperantha filiformis  Goldblatt & J.C.Manning, endemic
 Hesperantha flava  G.J.Lewis, endemic
 Hesperantha flexuosa  Klatt, endemic
 Hesperantha galpinii  R.C.Foster, accepted as Hesperantha woodii  Baker
 Hesperantha glabrescens  Goldblatt, endemic
 Hesperantha glareosa  Hilliard & B.L.Burtt, indigenous
 Hesperantha gracilis  Baker, endemic
 Hesperantha grandiflora  G.J.Lewis, indigenous
 Hesperantha hantamensis  Schltr. ex R.C.Foster, endemic
 Hesperantha helmei  Goldblatt & J.C.Manning, endemic
 Hesperantha humilis  Baker, endemic
 Hesperantha hutchingsiae  Hilliard & B.L.Burtt, endemic
 Hesperantha huttonii  (Baker) Hilliard & B.L.Burtt, endemic
 Hesperantha hygrophila  Hilliard & B.L.Burtt, indigenous
 Hesperantha inconspicua  (Baker) Goldblatt, endemic
 Hesperantha ingeliensis  Hilliard & B.L.Burtt, endemic
 Hesperantha juncifolia  Goldblatt, endemic
 Hesperantha karooica  Goldblatt, endemic
 Hesperantha kiaratayloriae  Goldblatt & J.C.Manning, endemic
 Hesperantha lactea  Baker, endemic
 Hesperantha latifolia  (Klatt) M.P.de Vos, endemic
 Hesperantha laxifolia  Goldblatt & J.C.Manning, indigenous
 Hesperantha leucantha  Baker, indigenous
 Hesperantha lithicola  J.C.Manning & Goldblatt, endemic
 Hesperantha longicollis  Baker, indigenous
 Hesperantha longituba  (Klatt) Baker, indigenous
 Hesperantha lutea  Benth. ex Baker, accepted as Hesperantha falcata  (L.f.) Ker Gawl. subsp. lutea (Benth. ex Baker) Goldblatt & J.C.Manning, indigenous
 Hesperantha lutea  Benth. ex Baker var. luculenta R.C.Foster, accepted as Hesperantha falcata  (L.f.) Ker Gawl. subsp. lutea (Benth. ex Baker) Goldblatt & J.C.Manning, indigenous
 Hesperantha luticola  Goldblatt, endemic
 Hesperantha malvina  Goldblatt, endemic
 Hesperantha marlothii  R.C.Foster, endemic
 Hesperantha minima  (Baker) R.C.Foster, endemic
 Hesperantha modesta  Baker, endemic
 Hesperantha montigena  Goldblatt, endemic
 Hesperantha muirii  (L.Bolus) G.J.Lewis, endemic
 Hesperantha namaquana  Goldblatt, endemic
 Hesperantha oligantha  (Diels) Goldblatt, endemic
 Hesperantha pallescens  Goldblatt, endemic
 Hesperantha palustris  Goldblatt & J.C.Manning, endemic
 Hesperantha pauciflora  (Baker) G.J.Lewis, endemic
 Hesperantha pilosa  (L.f.) Ker Gawl. endemic
 Hesperantha pilosa  (L.f.) Ker Gawl. subsp. bracteolata (R.C.Foster) Goldblatt & J.C.Manning, indigenous
 Hesperantha pilosa  (L.f.) Ker Gawl. subsp. pilosa, indigenous
 Hesperantha pseudopilosa  Goldblatt, endemic
 Hesperantha puberula  R.C.Foster, accepted as Hesperantha pilosa  (L.f.) Ker Gawl. subsp. bracteolata (R.C.Foster) Goldblatt & J.C.Manning, indigenous
 Hesperantha pubinervia  Hilliard & B.L.Burtt, endemic
 Hesperantha pulchra  Baker, endemic
 Hesperantha purpurea  Goldblatt, endemic
 Hesperantha quadrangula  Goldblatt, endemic
 Hesperantha radiata  (Jacq.) Ker Gawl. indigenous
 Hesperantha radiata  (Jacq.) Ker Gawl. subsp. radiata, endemic
 Hesperantha rivulicola  Goldblatt, endemic
 Hesperantha rupestris  N.E.Br. ex R.C.Foster, endemic
 Hesperantha rupicola  Goldblatt, endemic
 Hesperantha saldanhae  Goldblatt, endemic
 Hesperantha saxicola  Goldblatt, endemic
 Hesperantha schelpeana  Hilliard & B.L.Burtt, indigenous
 Hesperantha schlechteri  (Baker) R.C.Foster, endemic
 Hesperantha scopulosa  Hilliard & B.L.Burtt, indigenous
 Hesperantha secunda  Goldblatt & J.C.Manning, endemic
 Hesperantha similis  N.E.Br. ex R.C.Foster, accepted as Hesperantha schlechteri  (Baker) R.C.Foster
 Hesperantha spicata  (Burm.f.) N.E.Br. endemic
 Hesperantha spicata  (Burm.f.) N.E.Br. subsp. fistulosa (Baker) Goldblatt, endemic
 Hesperantha spicata  (Burm.f.) N.E.Br. subsp. graminifolia (Sweet) Goldblatt, endemic
 Hesperantha spicata  (Burm.f.) N.E.Br. subsp. spicata, endemic
 Hesperantha stenosiphon  Goldblatt, endemic
 Hesperantha sufflava  Goldblatt, endemic
 Hesperantha teretifolia  Goldblatt, endemic
 Hesperantha truncatula  Goldblatt, endemic
 Hesperantha tysonii  Baker, accepted as Hesperantha radiata  (Jacq.) Ker Gawl.
 Hesperantha vaginata  (Sweet) Goldblatt, endemic
 Hesperantha vernalis  Hilliard & B.L.Burtt, accepted as Hesperantha candida  Baker
 Hesperantha woodii  Baker, indigenous

Hexaglottis 
Genus Hexaglottis:
 Hexaglottis brevituba  Goldblatt, accepted as Moraea brevituba  (Goldblatt) Goldblatt
 Hexaglottis lewisiae  Goldblatt subsp. lewisiae, accepted as Moraea lewisiae  (Goldblatt) Goldblatt subsp. lewisiae
 Hexaglottis lewisiae  Goldblatt subsp. secunda Goldblatt, accepted as Moraea lewisiae  (Goldblatt) Goldblatt subsp. secunda (Goldblatt) Goldblatt
 Hexaglottis longifolia  (Jacq.) Salisb. accepted as Moraea longifolia  (Jacq.) Pers.
 Hexaglottis namaquana  Goldblatt, accepted as Moraea namaquana  (Goldblatt) Goldblatt
 Hexaglottis nana  L.Bolus, accepted as Moraea nana  (L.Bolus) Goldblatt & J.C.Manning
 Hexaglottis riparia  Goldblatt, accepted as Moraea riparia  (Goldblatt) Goldblatt
 Hexaglottis virgata  (Jacq.) Sweet subsp. karooica Goldblatt, accepted as Moraea virgata  Jacq. subsp. karooica (Goldblatt) Goldblatt
 Hexaglottis virgata  (Jacq.) Sweet subsp. virgata, accepted as Moraea virgata  Jacq. subsp. virgata

Homeria 
Genus Homeria:
 Homeria autumnalis  Goldblatt, accepted as Moraea autumnalis  (Goldblatt) Goldblatt
 Homeria bifida  L.Bolus, accepted as Moraea bifida  (L.Bolus) Goldblatt
 Homeria bolusiae  Goldblatt, accepted as Moraea louisabolusiae  Goldblatt
 Homeria brachygyne  Schltr. accepted as Moraea brachygyne  (Schltr.) Goldblatt
 Homeria britteniae  L.Bolus, accepted as Moraea britteniae  (L.Bolus) Goldblatt
 Homeria bulbillifera  G.J.Lewis subsp. anomala Goldblatt, accepted as Moraea bulbillifera  (G.J.Lewis) Goldblatt subsp. anomala (Goldblatt) Goldblatt
 Homeria bulbillifera  G.J.Lewis subsp. bulbillifera, accepted as Moraea bulbillifera  (G.J.Lewis) Goldblatt subsp. bulbillifera
 Homeria cedarmontana  Goldblatt, accepted as Moraea cedarmonticola  Goldblatt
 Homeria collina  (Thunb.) Salisb. accepted as Moraea collina  Thunb.
 Homeria comptonii  L.Bolus, accepted as Moraea comptonii  (L.Bolus) Goldblatt
 Homeria cookii  L.Bolus, accepted as Moraea cookii  (L.Bolus) Goldblatt
 Homeria elegans  (Jacq.) Sweet, accepted as Moraea elegans  Jacq.
 Homeria fenestrata  Goldblatt, accepted as Moraea fenestrata  (Goldblatt) Goldblatt
 Homeria flaccida  Sweet, accepted as Moraea flaccida  (Sweet) Steud.
 Homeria flavescens  Goldblatt, accepted as Moraea flavescens  (Goldblatt) Goldblatt
 Homeria fuscomontana  Goldblatt, accepted as Moraea fuscomontana  (Goldblatt) Goldblatt
 Homeria galpinii  L.Bolus, accepted as Moraea pyrophila  Goldblatt
 Homeria hantamensis  Goldblatt & J.C.Manning, accepted as Moraea reflexa  Goldblatt
 Homeria longistyla  Goldblatt, accepted as Moraea longistyla  (Goldblatt) Goldblatt
 Homeria marlothii  L.Bolus, accepted as Moraea marlothii  (L.Bolus) Goldblatt
 Homeria miniata  (Andrews) Sweet, accepted as Moraea miniata  Andrews
 Homeria minor  (Eckl.) Goldblatt, accepted as Moraea minor  Eckl.
 Homeria ochroleuca  Salisb. accepted as Moraea ochroleuca  (Salisb.) Drapiez
 Homeria odorata  L.Bolus, accepted as Moraea fragrans  Goldblatt
 Homeria pallida  Baker, accepted as Moraea pallida  (Baker) Goldblatt
 Homeria patens  Goldblatt, accepted as Moraea patens  (Goldblatt) Goldblatt
 Homeria pendula  Goldblatt, accepted as Moraea pendula  (Goldblatt) Goldblatt
 Homeria radians  (Goldblatt) Goldblatt, accepted as Moraea radians  (Goldblatt) Goldblatt
 Homeria ramosissima  Schltr. accepted as Moraea knersvlaktensis  Goldblatt
 Homeria schlechteri  L.Bolus, accepted as Moraea schlechteri  (L.Bolus) Goldblatt
 Homeria serratostyla  Goldblatt, accepted as Moraea serratostyla  (Goldblatt) Goldblatt
 Homeria spiralis  L.Bolus, accepted as Moraea aspera  Goldblatt
 Homeria tenuis  Schltr. accepted as Moraea demissa  Goldblatt
 Homeria tricolor  G.J.Lewis, accepted as Moraea karroica  Goldblatt
 Homeria vallisbelli  Goldblatt, accepted as Moraea vallisbelli  (Goldblatt) Goldblatt

Homoglossum 
Genus Homoglossum:
 Homoglossum merianellum  (Thunb.) Baker, accepted as Gladiolus merianellus  (L.) Thunb. indigenous
 Homoglossum merianellum  (Thunb.) Baker var. aureum G.J.Lewis, accepted as Gladiolus merianellus  (L.) Thunb. indigenous

Huouttuynia 
Genus Houttuynia:
 Houttuynia capensis  Houtt. accepted as Ixia paniculata  D.Delaroche, indigenous

Hyalis 
Genus Hyalis:
 Hyalis aulica  (Aiton) Salisb. accepted as Ixia latifolia  D.Delaroche, indigenous
 Hyalis latifolia  (D.Delaroche) Salisb. accepted as Ixia latifolia  D.Delaroche, indigenous
 Hyalis longiflora  (P.J.Bergius) Salisb. accepted as Ixia paniculata  D.Delaroche, indigenous
 Hyalis marginifolia  Salisb. accepted as Ixia marginifolia  Salisb. ex G.J.Lewis, indigenous

Iris 
Genus Iris:
 Iris pseudacorus L. not indigenous, cultivated, invasive

Ixia 
Genus Ixia:
 Ixia abbreviata Houtt. endemic
 Ixia abbreviata Houtt. var. ovata (Andrews) Goldblatt & J.C.Manning, accepted as Ixia abbreviata Houtt. endemic
 Ixia acaulis Goldblatt & J.C.Manning, endemic
 Ixia alata Goldblatt & J.C.Manning, endemic
 Ixia alba Eckl. accepted as Ixia orientalis L.Bolus, indigenous
 Ixia alboflavens Eckl. accepted as Ixia abbreviata Houtt. indigenous
 Ixia alticola Goldblatt & J.C.Manning, endemic
 Ixia altissima Goldblatt & J.C.Manning, endemic
 Ixia amethystina J.C.Manning & Goldblatt, accepted as Ixia brevituba G.J.Lewis, endemic
 Ixia amoena Salisb. accepted as Ixia maculata L. indigenous
 Ixia angelae Goldblatt & J.C.Manning, endemic
 Ixia angusta L.Bolus, accepted as Ixia patens Aiton, indigenous
 Ixia angustifolia (Andrews) Klatt, accepted as Ixia monadelpha D.Delaroche, indigenous
 Ixia aristata Thunb. accepted as Ixia campanulata Houtt. indigenous
 Ixia aristata Thunb. var. elegans (Regel) Baker, accepted as Ixia polystachya L. indigenous
 Ixia atrandra Goldblatt & J.C.Manning, endemic
 Ixia aulica Aiton, accepted as Ixia latifolia D.Delaroche, indigenous
 Ixia aurea J.C.Manning & Goldblatt, endemic
 Ixia avellana R.C.Foster, accepted as Ixia odorata Ker Gawl. indigenous
 Ixia bellendenii R.C.Foster, endemic
 Ixia bifolia Goldblatt & J.C.Manning, endemic
 Ixia bolusii G.J.Lewis, accepted as Ixia paucifolia G.J.Lewis, indigenous
 Ixia brevituba G.J.Lewis, endemic
 Ixia brunneobractea G.J.Lewis, endemic
 Ixia calendulacea Goldblatt & J.C.Manning, endemic
 Ixia campanulata Houtt. endemic
 Ixia cana Eckl. accepted as Ixia viridiflora Lam. indigenous
 Ixia candida Delile, accepted as Ixia leucantha Jacq. indigenous
 Ixia capillaris L.f. endemic
 Ixia capillaris L.f. var. aulica (Aiton) Ker Gawl. accepted as Ixia latifolia D.Delaroche, indigenous
 Ixia capillaris L.f. var. gracillima Ker Gawl. accepted as Ixia capillaris L.f. indigenous
 Ixia capillaris L.f. var. incarnata (Jacq.) Ker Gawl. accepted as Ixia latifolia D.Delaroche, indigenous
 Ixia capillaris L.f. var. lancea (Jacq.) Ker Gawl. accepted as Ixia marginifolia Salisb. ex G.J.Lewis, indigenous
 Ixia capillaris L.f. var. stricta Ker Gawl. accepted as Ixia marginifolia Salisb. ex G.J.Lewis, indigenous
 Ixia capitata Andrews, accepted as Ixia maculata L. indigenous
 Ixia capitata Andrews var. ovata Andrews, accepted as Ixia abbreviata Houtt. indigenous
 Ixia capitata Andrews var. stellata Andrews, accepted as Ixia divaricata Goldblatt & J.C.Manning, indigenous
 Ixia cartilaginea Lam. accepted as Ixia monadelpha D.Delaroche, indigenous
 Ixia caryophyllacea Burm.f. accepted as Freesia caryophyllacea (Burm.f.) N.E.Br.
 Ixia cedarmontana Goldblatt & J.C.Manning, endemic
 Ixia coccinea Eckl. accepted as Ixia campanulata Houtt. indigenous
 Ixia coccinea Thunb. accepted as Ixia campanulata Houtt. indigenous
 Ixia cochlearis G.J.Lewis, endemic
 Ixia collina Goldblatt & Snijman, endemic
 Ixia columellaris Ker Gawl. accepted as Ixia monadelpha D.Delaroche, indigenous
 Ixia columnaris Salisb. accepted as Ixia monadelpha D.Delaroche, indigenous
 Ixia columnaris Salisb. var. angustifolia Andrews, accepted as Ixia monadelpha D.Delaroche, indigenous
 Ixia columnaris Salisb. var. grandiflora Andrews, accepted as Ixia monadelpha D.Delaroche, indigenous
 Ixia columnaris Salisb. var. latifolia Andrews, accepted as Ixia monadelpha D.Delaroche, indigenous
 Ixia columnaris Salisb. var. purpurea Andrews, accepted as Ixia monadelpha D.Delaroche, indigenous
 Ixia columnaris Salisb. var. rhodolarynx Baker, accepted as Ixia monadelpha D.Delaroche, indigenous
 Ixia columnaris Salisb. var. versicolor Andrews, accepted as Ixia monadelpha D.Delaroche, indigenous
 Ixia concolor Salisb. accepted as Ixia campanulata Houtt. indigenous
 Ixia conferta R.C.Foster, accepted as Ixia abbreviata Houtt. indigenous
 Ixia conferta R.C.Foster var. ochroleuca (Ker Gawl.) G.J.Lewis, accepted as Ixia abbreviata Houtt. indigenous
 Ixia confusa (G.J.Lewis) Goldblatt & J.C.Manning, endemic
 Ixia conica Salisb. accepted as Ixia maculata L. indigenous
 Ixia contorta Goldblatt & J.C.Manning, endemic
 Ixia corymbosa L. accepted as Codonorhiza corymbosa (L.) Goldblatt & J.C.Manning
 Ixia crateroides Ker Gawl. accepted as Ixia campanulata Houtt. indigenous
 Ixia crispa L.f. accepted as Tritonia undulata (Burm.f.) Baker, indigenous
 Ixia crispifolia Andrews, accepted as Codonorhiza corymbosa (L.) Goldblatt & J.C.Manning
 Ixia curta Andrews, endemic
 Ixia curvata G.J.Lewis, endemic
 Ixia densiflora Klatt, accepted as Ixia patens Aiton, indigenous
 Ixia dieramoides Goldblatt & J.C.Manning, endemic
 Ixia dispar N.E.Br. accepted as Ixia patens Aiton, indigenous
 Ixia divaricata Goldblatt & J.C.Manning, endemic
 Ixia dolichosiphon Goldblatt & J.C.Manning, endemic
 Ixia dubia Vent. endemic
 Ixia duckittiae L.Bolus, accepted as Ixia maculata L. indigenous
 Ixia ecklonii Goldblatt & J.C.Manning, endemic
 Ixia elegans (Regel) N.E.Br. accepted as Ixia polystachya L. indigenous
 Ixia elliptica Thunb. accepted as Freesia verrucosa (B.Vogel) Goldblatt & J.C.Manning
 Ixia emarginata Lam. accepted as Freesia verrucosa (B.Vogel) Goldblatt & J.C.Manning
 Ixia erecta P.J.Bergius, accepted as Ixia polystachya L. indigenous
 Ixia erecta Thunb. accepted as Ixia odorata Ker Gawl. indigenous
 Ixia erecta Thunb. var. lutea-odorata Ker Gawl. accepted as Ixia odorata Ker Gawl. indigenous
 Ixia erubescens Goldblatt, endemic
 Ixia esterhuyseniae M.P.de Vos, endemic
 Ixia exiliflora Goldblatt & J.C.Manning, endemic
 Ixia fastigiata Lam. accepted as Lapeirousia fastigiata (Lam.) Ker Gawl.
 Ixia filiformis Vent. accepted as Ixia patens Aiton, indigenous
 Ixia flaccida (G.J.Lewis) Goldblatt & J.C.Manning, accepted as Ixia mollis Goldblatt & J.C.Manning, endemic
 Ixia flaccida Salisb. accepted as Ixia patens Aiton, indigenous
 Ixia flagellaris Goldblatt & J.C.Manning, endemic
 Ixia flava Hornem. accepted as Ixia maculata L. indigenous
 Ixia flavescens Eckl. accepted as Ixia odorata Ker Gawl. indigenous
 Ixia flexuosa L. endemic
 Ixia flexuosa Mill. accepted as Ixia flexuosa L. indigenous
 Ixia framesii L.Bolus, accepted as Ixia tenuifolia Vahl, indigenous
 Ixia frederickii M.P.de Vos, accepted as Ixia dubia Vent. indigenous
 Ixia fucata Ker Gawl. endemic
 Ixia fucata Ker Gawl. var. filifolia G.J.Lewis, accepted as Ixia stenophylla Goldblatt & J.C.Manning, indigenous
 Ixia fuscocitrina Desf. ex DC. endemic
 Ixia galaxioides Klatt, accepted as Ixia monadelpha D.Delaroche, indigenous
 Ixia gawleri Schrad. accepted as Freesia verrucosa (B.Vogel) Goldblatt & J.C.Manning
 Ixia gladiolaris Lam. accepted as Tritonia gladiolaris (Lam.) Goldblatt & J.C.Manning, indigenous
 Ixia gloriosa G.J.Lewis, endemic
 Ixia gracilis Salisb. accepted as Ixia capillaris L.f. indigenous
 Ixia grandiflora (Andrews) Pers. accepted as Ixia monadelpha D.Delaroche, indigenous
 Ixia helmei Goldblatt & J.C.Manning, endemic
 Ixia heterophylla Willd. accepted as Lapeirousia plicata (Jacq.) Diels subsp. plicata
 Ixia incarnata Jacq. accepted as Ixia latifolia D.Delaroche, indigenous
 Ixia lacerata Goldblatt & J.C.Manning, endemic
 Ixia lancea Jacq. accepted as Ixia marginifolia Salisb. ex G.J.Lewis, indigenous
 Ixia latifolia D.Delaroche, endemic
 Ixia latifolia D.Delaroche var. angustifolia G.J.Lewis, accepted as Ixia divaricata Goldblatt & J.C.Manning, endemic
 Ixia latifolia D.Delaroche var. curviramosa G.J.Lewis, accepted as Ixia latifolia D.Delaroche, endemic
 Ixia latifolia D.Delaroche var. parviflora G.J.Lewis, accepted as Ixia parva Goldblatt & J.C.Manning, endemic
 Ixia latifolia D.Delaroche var. ramulosa G.J.Lewis, accepted as Ixia ramulosa (G.J.Lewis) Goldblatt & J.C.Manning, endemic
 Ixia leipoldtii G.J.Lewis, endemic
 Ixia leucantha Jacq. endemic
 Ixia leucantha Jacq. var. aristata (Thunb.) Baker, accepted as Ixia campanulata Houtt. indigenous
 Ixia linderi Goldblatt & J.C.Manning, endemic
 Ixia linearifolia Goldblatt & J.C.Manning, endemic
 Ixia longiflora Lam. accepted as Ixia paniculata D.Delaroche, indigenous
 Ixia longiflora P.J.Bergius, accepted as Ixia paniculata D.Delaroche, indigenous
 Ixia longistylis (M.P.de Vos) Goldblatt & J.C.Manning, endemic
 Ixia longituba N.E.Br. endemic
 Ixia longituba N.E.Br. subsp. longituba, endemic
 Ixia longituba N.E.Br. subsp. macrosiphon Goldblatt & J.C.Manning, endemic
 Ixia longituba N.E.Br. var. bellendenii (R.C.Foster) M.P.de Vos, accepted as Ixia bellendenii R.C.Foster, endemic
 Ixia lutea Eckl. accepted as Ixia abbreviata Houtt. indigenous
 Ixia lutea Eckl. var. ovata (Andrews) B.Nord. accepted as Ixia abbreviata Houtt. endemic
 Ixia macrocarpa Goldblatt & J.C.Manning, endemic
 Ixia maculata L. endemic
 Ixia maculata L. var. amethystina Ker Gawl. accepted as Ixia viridiflora Lam. indigenous
 Ixia maculata L. var. caesia Ker Gawl. accepted as Ixia polystachya L. indigenous
 Ixia maculata L. var. fuscocitrina (Desf. ex DC.) G.J.Lewis, accepted as Ixia fuscocitrina Desf. ex DC. endemic
 Ixia maculata L. var. intermedia G.J.Lewis, accepted as Ixia calendulacea Goldblatt & J.C.Manning, endemic
 Ixia maculata L. var. nigroalbida (Klatt) Baker, accepted as Ixia abbreviata Houtt. indigenous
 Ixia maculata L. var. ochroleuca Ker Gawl. accepted as Ixia abbreviata Houtt. indigenous
 Ixia maculata L. var. viridis Jacq. accepted as Ixia viridiflora Lam. indigenous
 Ixia maculata L. var. viridis Ker Gawl. accepted as Ixia viridiflora Lam. indigenous
 Ixia marginifolia Salisb. ex G.J.Lewis, endemic
 Ixia metelerkampiae L.Bolus, endemic
 Ixia micrandra Baker, endemic
 Ixia micrandra Baker var. confusa G.J.Lewis, accepted as Ixia confusa (G.J.Lewis) Goldblatt & J.C.Manning, endemic
 Ixia micrandra Baker var. minor G.J.Lewis, accepted as Ixia minor (G.J.Lewis) Goldblatt & J.C.Manning, endemic
 Ixia milleri P.J.Bergius, accepted as Ixia maculata L. indigenous
 Ixia minor (G.J.Lewis) Goldblatt & J.C.Manning, endemic
 Ixia mollis Goldblatt & J.C.Manning, endemic
 Ixia monadelpha D.Delaroche, endemic
 Ixia monadelpha D.Delaroche var. curta (Andrews) Ker Gawl. accepted as Ixia curta Andrews, indigenous
 Ixia monticola Goldblatt & J.C.Manning, endemic
 Ixia mostertii M.P.de Vos, endemic
 Ixia namaquana L.Bolus, endemic
 Ixia nigroalbida Klatt, accepted as Ixia abbreviata Houtt. indigenous
 Ixia ochroleuca (Ker Gawl.) Sweet, accepted as Ixia abbreviata Houtt. indigenous
 Ixia odorata Ker Gawl. endemic
 Ixia odorata Ker Gawl. var. hesperanthoides G.J.Lewis, accepted as Ixia odorata Ker Gawl. endemic
 Ixia orientalis L.Bolus, endemic
 Ixia ovata (Andrews) Sweet var. stellata (Andrews) Baker, accepted as Ixia divaricata Goldblatt & J.C.Manning, indigenous
 Ixia oxalidiflora Goldblatt & J.C.Manning, endemic
 Ixia pallideflavens Eckl. accepted as Ixia maculata L. indigenous
 Ixia paniculata D.Delaroche, endemic
 Ixia paniculata D.Delaroche var. rochensis (Ker Gawl.) Baker, accepted as Ixia bellendenii R.C.Foster, indigenous
 Ixia paniculata D.Delaroche var. tenuiflora (Vahl) Baker, accepted as Ixia paniculata D.Delaroche, indigenous
 Ixia parva Goldblatt & J.C.Manning, endemic
 Ixia patens Aiton, endemic
 Ixia patens Aiton var. kermesina Regel, accepted as Ixia patens Aiton, indigenous
 Ixia patens Aiton var. leucantha (Jacq.) Ker Gawl. accepted as Ixia leucantha Jacq. indigenous
 Ixia patens Aiton var. linearifolia G.J.Lewis, accepted as Ixia patens Aiton, endemic
 Ixia pauciflora G.J.Lewis, endemic
 Ixia paucifolia G.J.Lewis, endemic
 Ixia pavonia Goldblatt & J.C.Manning, endemic
 Ixia pentandra L.f. accepted as Ixia scillaris L. subsp. scillaris, indigenous
 Ixia phlogiflora Delile, accepted as Ixia latifolia D.Delaroche, indigenous
 Ixia polystachya L. endemic
 Ixia polystachya L. var. crassifolia G.J.Lewis, accepted as Ixia polystachya L. endemic
 Ixia polystachya L. var. flavescens (Eckl.) Baker, accepted as Ixia odorata Ker Gawl. indigenous
 Ixia polystachya L. var. incarnata Andr. accepted as Ixia scillaris L. subsp. latifolia Goldblatt & J.C.Manning, indigenous
 Ixia polystachya L. var. longistylis M.P.de Vos, accepted as Ixia longistylis (M.P.de Vos) Goldblatt & J.C.Manning, endemic
 Ixia polystachya L. var. lutea (Ker Gawl.) G.J.Lewis, accepted as Ixia erecta Thunb. var. lutea Ker Gawl. endemic
 Ixia polystacia Mill. accepted as Ixia polystachya L. indigenous
 Ixia prasina Sol. ex Baker, accepted as Ixia viridiflora Lam. indigenous
 Ixia pulcherrima Eckl. accepted as Ixia tenuifolia Vahl, indigenous
 Ixia pulchra Salisb. accepted as Ixia viridiflora Lam. indigenous
 Ixia pumilio Goldblatt & Snijman, endemic
 Ixia punicea Eckl. accepted as Ixia patens Aiton, indigenous
 Ixia purpurea (Klatt) Klatt, accepted as Ixia monadelpha D.Delaroche, indigenous
 Ixia purpurea Jacq., accepted as Babiana purpurea Ker Gawl. indigenous
 Ixia purpurea Lam. accepted as Tritonia crocata (L.) Ker Gawl. indigenous
 Ixia purpureorosea G.J.Lewis, endemic
 Ixia pyramidalis Lam. accepted as Lapeirousia pyramidalis (Lam.) Goldblatt subsp. pyramidalis
 Ixia ramulosa (G.J.Lewis) Goldblatt & J.C.Manning, endemic
 Ixia rapunculoides Delile, endemic
 Ixia rapunculoides Delile var. flaccida G.J.Lewis, accepted as Ixia mollis Goldblatt & J.C.Manning, endemic
 Ixia rapunculoides Delile var. namaquana (L.Bolus) G.J.Lewis, accepted as Ixia namaquana L.Bolus, endemic
 Ixia rapunculoides Delile var. rigida G.J.Lewis, accepted as Ixia divaricata Goldblatt & J.C.Manning, endemic
 Ixia rapunculoides Delile var. robusta G.J.Lewis, accepted as Ixia robusta (G.J.Lewis) Goldblatt & J.C.Manning, endemic
 Ixia rapunculoides Delile var. subpendula G.J.Lewis, accepted as Ixia divaricata Goldblatt & J.C.Manning, endemic
 Ixia reclinata Goldblatt & J.C.Manning, endemic
 Ixia recondita Goldblatt & J.C.Manning, endemic
 Ixia reflexa Andr. accepted as Ixia scillaris L. subsp. latifolia Goldblatt & J.C.Manning, indigenous
 Ixia rigida Goldblatt & J.C.Manning, endemic
 Ixia rivulicola Goldblatt & J.C.Manning, endemic
 Ixia robusta (G.J.Lewis) Goldblatt & J.C.Manning, endemic
 Ixia rochensis (Ker Gawl.) L.Bolus, accepted as Ixia bellendenii R.C.Foster, indigenous
 Ixia rochensis Ker Gawl. accepted as Geissorhiza radians (Thunb.) Goldblatt, indigenous
 Ixia roseoalba Goldblatt & J.C.Manning, endemic
 Ixia rotata Ker Gawl. accepted as Ixia scillaris L. subsp. latifolia Goldblatt & J.C.Manning, indigenous
 Ixia rouxii G.J.Lewis, endemic
 Ixia sarmentosa Goldblatt & J.C.Manning, endemic
 Ixia saundersiana Goldblatt & J.C.Manning, endemic
 Ixia scariosa Thunb. accepted as Ixia latifolia D.Delaroche, indigenous
 Ixia scariosa Thunb. var. longifolia Baker, accepted as Ixia divaricata Goldblatt & J.C.Manning, indigenous
 Ixia scariosa Thunb. var. longifolia Baker, accepted as Ixia orientalis L.Bolus, indigenous
 Ixia scillaris L. endemic
 Ixia scillaris L. subsp. latifolia Goldblatt & J.C.Manning, endemic
 Ixia scillaris L. subsp. scillaris, endemic
 Ixia scillaris L. subsp. toximontana Goldblatt & J.C.Manning, endemic
 Ixia scillaris L. var. angustifolia Ker Gawl. accepted as Ixia scillaris L. subsp. latifolia Goldblatt & J.C.Manning, indigenous
 Ixia scillaris L. var. latifolia Ker Gawl. accepted as Ixia scillaris L. subsp. latifolia Goldblatt & J.C.Manning, indigenous
 Ixia scillaris L. var. subundulata G.J.Lewis, accepted as Ixia scillaris L. subsp. latifolia Goldblatt & J.C.Manning, endemic
 Ixia serotina Salisb. accepted as Ixia polystachya L. indigenous
 Ixia simulans Goldblatt & J.C.Manning, endemic
 Ixia sobolifera Goldblatt & J.C.Manning, endemic
 Ixia sobolifera Goldblatt & J.C.Manning subsp. albiflora Goldblatt & J.C.Manning, endemic
 Ixia sobolifera Goldblatt & J.C.Manning subsp. carnea Goldblatt & J.C.Manning, endemic
 Ixia sobolifera Goldblatt & J.C.Manning subsp. sobolifera, endemic
 Ixia sparrmanii (Thunb.) Roem. & Schult. accepted as Freesia sparrmanii (Thunb.) N.E.Br.
 Ixia speciosa Andrews, accepted as Ixia campanulata Houtt. indigenous
 Ixia spectabilis Salisb. accepted as Ixia viridiflora Lam. indigenous
 Ixia spicata Burm.f. var. viridinigra Andrews, accepted as Ixia viridiflora Lam. indigenous
 Ixia splendida G.J.Lewis, endemic
 Ixia stellata (Andrews) Klatt, accepted as Ixia divaricata Goldblatt & J.C.Manning, indigenous
 Ixia stenophylla Goldblatt & J.C.Manning, endemic
 Ixia stohriae L.Bolus, endemic
 Ixia stolonifera G.J.Lewis, endemic
 Ixia striata Vahl, accepted as Tritonia gladiolaris (Lam.) Goldblatt & J.C.Manning, indigenous
 Ixia stricta (Eckl. ex Klatt) G.J.Lewis, endemic
 Ixia superba J.C.Manning & Goldblatt, endemic
 Ixia tenella Klatt, accepted as Ixia capillaris L.f. indigenous
 Ixia tenuiflora Vahl, accepted as Ixia paniculata D.Delaroche, indigenous
 Ixia tenuifolia Vahl, endemic
 Ixia tenuis Goldblatt & J.C.Manning, endemic
 Ixia teretifolia Goldblatt & J.C.Manning, endemic
 Ixia thomasiae Goldblatt, endemic
 Ixia trifolia G.J.Lewis, endemic
 Ixia trinervata (Baker) G.J.Lewis, endemic
 Ixia vanzijliae L.Bolus, endemic
 Ixia variegata Banks ex Ker Gawl. accepted as Ixia monadelpha D.Delaroche, indigenous
 Ixia verrucosa B.Vogel, accepted as Freesia verrucosa (B.Vogel) Goldblatt & J.C.Manning
 Ixia versicolor G.J.Lewis, endemic
 Ixia vinacea G.J.Lewis, endemic
 Ixia viridiflora Lam. endemic
 Ixia viridiflora Lam. var. caesia (Ker Gawl.) Baker, accepted as Ixia polystachya L. indigenous
 Ixia viridiflora Lam. var. cana (Eckl.) Baker, accepted as Ixia viridiflora Lam. indigenous
 Ixia viridiflora Lam. var. minor M.P.de Vos, accepted as Ixia viridiflora Lam. endemic
 Ixia viridis Thunb. accepted as Ixia viridiflora Lam. indigenous
 Ixia vitellina Eckl. accepted as Ixia maculata L. indigenous

Klattia 
Genus Klattia:
 Klattia flava (G.J.Lewis) Goldblatt, endemic
 Klattia partita Baker, endemic
 Klattia partita Baker var. flava G.J.Lewis, accepted as Klattia flava (G.J.Lewis) Goldblatt
 Klattia stokoei L.Guthrie, endemic

Lapeirousia 
Genus Lapeirousia:
 Lapeirousia anceps (L.f.) Ker Gawl. endemic
 Lapeirousia arenicola Schltr. endemic
 Lapeirousia azurea (Eckl. ex Baker) Goldblatt, accepted as Codonorhiza azurea (Eckl. ex Baker) Goldblatt & J.C.Manning, endemic
 Lapeirousia bainesii Baker, accepted as Afrosolen bainesii (Baker) Goldblatt & J.C.Manning, indigenous
 Lapeirousia barklyi Baker, indigenous
 Lapeirousia bracteata (Thunb.) Ker Gawl. accepted as Lapeirousia pyramidalis (Lam.) Goldblatt subsp. pyramidalis
 Lapeirousia burchellii Baker, accepted as Lapeirousia littoralis Baker subsp. littoralis
 Lapeirousia caespitosa (Licht. ex Roem. & Schult.) Baker, accepted as Lapeirousia plicata (Jacq.) Diels subsp. foliosa Goldblatt & J.C.Manning
 Lapeirousia caudata Schinz, accepted as Lapeirousia littoralis Baker, indigenous
 Lapeirousia corymbosa (L.) Ker Gawl. accepted as Codonorhiza corymbosa (L.) Goldblatt & J.C.Manning, endemic
 Lapeirousia dinteri Schinz, accepted as Afrosolen coeruleus (Schinz) Goldblatt & J.C.Manning
 Lapeirousia divaricata Baker, endemic
 Lapeirousia divaricata Baker var. spinosa Goldblatt, accepted as Lapeirousia spinosa (Goldblatt) Goldblatt & J.C.Manning
 Lapeirousia divaricata Baker var. tenuis Goldblatt, accepted as Lapeirousia tenuis (Goldblatt) Goldblatt & J.C.Manning
 Lapeirousia dolomitica Dinter, indigenous
 Lapeirousia dolomitica Dinter subsp. lewisiana (B.Nord.) Goldblatt, accepted as Lapeirousia lewisiana B.Nord. endemic
 Lapeirousia effurcata G.J.Lewis, accepted as Lapeirousia plicata (Jacq.) Diels subsp. effurcata (G.J.Lewis) Goldblatt
 Lapeirousia erythrantha (Klotzsch ex Klatt) Baker, accepted as Afrosolen erythranthus (Klotzsch ex Klatt) Goldblatt & J.C.Manning
 Lapeirousia exilis Goldblatt, endemic
 Lapeirousia fabricii (D.Delaroche) Ker Gawl. endemic
 Lapeirousia fabricii (D.Delaroche) Ker Gawl. subsp. compressa (Pourr.) Goldblatt & J.C.Manning, indigenous
 Lapeirousia fabricii (D.Delaroche) Ker Gawl. subsp. fabricii, indigenous
 Lapeirousia fabricii (D.Delaroche) Ker Gawl. subsp. purpurascens Goldblatt & J.C.Manning, indigenous
 Lapeirousia falcata (L.f.) Ker Gawl. accepted as Codonorhiza falcata (L.f.) Goldblatt & J.C.Manning, endemic
 Lapeirousia fasciculata Ker Gawl. accepted as Lapeirousia plicata (Jacq.) Diels subsp. plicata
 Lapeirousia fastigiata (Lam.) Ker Gawl. endemic
 Lapeirousia galaxioides Baker, accepted as Lapeirousia plicata (Jacq.) Diels subsp. foliosa Goldblatt & J.C.Manning
 Lapeirousia graebneriana Harms, accepted as Freesia laxa (Thunb.) Goldblatt & J.C.Manning subsp. laxa
 Lapeirousia graminifolia (Baker) L.Bolus, accepted as Freesia grandiflora (Baker) Klatt subsp. grandiflora
 Lapeirousia homoidea Klatt, accepted as Lapeirousia pyramidalis (Lam.) Goldblatt subsp. pyramidalis
 Lapeirousia jacquinii N.E.Br. endemic
 Lapeirousia juncea Ker Gawl. accepted as Freesia verrucosa (B.Vogel) Goldblatt & J.C.Manning
 Lapeirousia kalahariensis Goldblatt & J.C.Manning, indigenous
 Lapeirousia kamiesmontana Goldblatt & J.C.Manning, indigenous
 Lapeirousia lewisiana B.Nord. indigenous
 Lapeirousia littoralis Baker, indigenous
 Lapeirousia littoralis Baker subsp. caudata (Schinz) Goldblatt, indigenous
 Lapeirousia littoralis Baker subsp. littoralis, indigenous
 Lapeirousia macrospatha Baker, endemic
 Lapeirousia manuleaeflora Eckl. accepted as Codonorhiza micrantha (E.Mey. ex Klatt) Goldblatt & J.C.Manning
 Lapeirousia masukuensis Vaupel & Schltr. accepted as Afrosolen masukuensis (Vaupel & Schltr.) Goldblatt & J.C.Manning, indigenous
 Lapeirousia micrantha (E.Mey. ex Klatt) Baker, accepted as Codonorhiza micrantha (E.Mey. ex Klatt) Goldblatt & J.C.Manning
 Lapeirousia montana Klatt, endemic
 Lapeirousia neglecta Goldblatt, accepted as Schizorhiza neglecta (Goldblatt) Goldblatt & J.C.Manning
 Lapeirousia oreogena Schltr. ex Goldblatt, endemic
 Lapeirousia otaviensis R.C.Foster, accepted as Afrosolen otaviensis (R.C.Foster) Goldblatt & J.C.Manning
 Lapeirousia pappei Baker, accepted as Codonorhiza falcata (L.f.) Goldblatt & J.C.Manning
 Lapeirousia pentheri Baker, accepted as Lapeirousia anceps (L.f.) Ker Gawl.
 Lapeirousia plicata (Jacq.) Diels, indigenous
 Lapeirousia plicata (Jacq.) Diels subsp. effurcata (G.J.Lewis) Goldblatt, endemic
 Lapeirousia plicata (Jacq.) Diels subsp. foliosa Goldblatt & J.C.Manning, indigenous
 Lapeirousia plicata (Jacq.) Diels subsp. longifolia Goldblatt, accepted as Lapeirousia kalahariensis Goldblatt & J.C.Manning, indigenous
 Lapeirousia plicata (Jacq.) Diels subsp. plicata, indigenous
 Lapeirousia pupurea Goldblatt & J.C.Manning, indigenous
 Lapeirousia purpureo-lutea (Klatt) Baker, accepted as Lapeirousia fastigiata (Lam.) Ker Gawl.
 Lapeirousia pyramidalis (Lam.) Goldblatt, indigenous
 Lapeirousia pyramidalis (Lam.) Goldblatt subsp. pyramidalis, endemic
 Lapeirousia pyramidalis (Lam.) Goldblatt subsp. regalis Goldblatt & J.C.Manning, endemic
 Lapeirousia rivularis Wanntorp, accepted as Afrosolen rivularis (Wanntorp) Goldblatt & J.C.Manning
 Lapeirousia sandersonii Baker, accepted as Afrosolen sandersonii (Baker) Goldblatt & J.C.Manning, indigenous
 Lapeirousia silenoides (Jacq.) Ker Gawl. endemic
 Lapeirousia simulans Goldblatt & J.C.Manning, endemic
 Lapeirousia speciosa Schltr. accepted as Lapeirousia silenoides (Jacq.) Ker Gawl.
 Lapeirousia spinosa (Goldblatt) Goldblatt & J.C.Manning, endemic
 Lapeirousia tenuis (Goldblatt) Goldblatt & J.C.Manning, endemic
 Lapeirousia verecunda Goldblatt, endemic
 Lapeirousia violacea Goldblatt, endemic

Melasphaerula 
Genus Melasphaerula:
 Melasphaerula ramosa (L.) Klatt, accepted as Ixia scillaris L. subsp. scillaris, indigenous
 Melasphaerula ramosa (L.) N.E.Br., accepted as Melasphaerula graminea (L.f.) Ker Gawl. indigenous

Meristostigma 
Genus Meristostigma:
 Meristostigma aculeatum (Sweet) A.Dietr. accepted as Lapeirousia fabricii (D.Delaroche) Ker Gawl.
 Meristostigma corymbosum (L.) A.Dietr. accepted as Codonorhiza corymbosa (L.) Goldblatt & J.C.Manning
 Meristostigma falcatum (L.f.) A.Dietr. accepted as Codonorhiza falcata (L.f.) Goldblatt & J.C.Manning
 Meristostigma heterophyllum (Willd.) A.Dietr. accepted as Lapeirousia plicata (Jacq.) Diels subsp. plicata
 Meristostigma junceum (Ker Gawl.) Steud. accepted as Freesia verrucosa (B.Vogel) Goldblatt & J.C.Manning
 Meristostigma laxum (Thunb.) A.Dietr. accepted as Freesia laxa (Thunb.) Goldblatt & J.C.Manning subsp. laxa
 Meristostigma manuleaeflora (Eckl.) Steud. accepted as Codonorhiza micrantha (E.Mey. ex Klatt) Goldblatt & J.C.Manning
 Meristostigma silenoides (Jacq.) A.Dietr. accepted as Lapeirousia silenoides (Jacq.) Ker Gawl.

Micranthus 
Genus Micranthus:
 Micranthus alopecuroides (L.) Rothm. endemic
 Micranthus cruciatus Goldblatt & J.C.Manning, endemic
 Micranthus filifolius Goldblatt & J.C.Manning, endemic
 Micranthus junceus (Baker) N.E.Br. endemic
 Micranthus simplex Goldblatt & J.C.Manning, endemic
 Micranthus thereianthoides Goldblatt & J.C.Manning, endemic
 Micranthus tubulosus (Burm.f.) N.E.Br. endemic

Montbretia 
Genus Montbretia:
 Montbretia capensis (Houtt.) Voigt, accepted as Ixia paniculata D.Delaroche, indigenous
 Montbretia concolor (Sweet) Voigt, accepted as Ixia paniculata D.Delaroche, indigenous
 Montbretia lineata (Salisb.) Baker, accepted as Tritonia gladiolaris (Lam.) Goldblatt & J.C.Manning, indigenous
 Montbretia refracta (Jacq.) Endl. ex Heynh. accepted as Freesia refracta (Jacq.) Klatt
 Montbretia rocheana (Ker Gawl.) Heynh. accepted as Ixia bellendenii R.C.Foster, indigenous
 Montbretia tenuiflora (Vahl) Voigt, accepted as Ixia paniculata D.Delaroche, indigenous
 Montbretia viridis (Aiton) Voigt, accepted as Freesia viridis (Aiton) Goldblatt & J.C.Manning subsp. viridis
 Montbretia xanthospila (DC.) Heynh. accepted as Freesia caryophyllacea (Burm.f.) N.E.Br.

Moraea 
Genus Moraea:
 Moraea acocksii Goldblatt & J.C.Manning, indigenous
 Moraea albicuspa Goldblatt, indigenous
 Moraea albiflora (G.J.Lewis) Goldblatt, endemic
 Moraea algoensis Goldblatt, endemic
 Moraea alpina Goldblatt, indigenous
 Moraea alticola Goldblatt, indigenous
 Moraea amabilis Diels, indigenous
 Moraea amissa Goldblatt, endemic
 Moraea angulata Goldblatt, endemic
 Moraea angusta (Thunb.) Ker Gawl. endemic
 Moraea anomala G.J.Lewis, endemic
 Moraea apetala L.Bolus, accepted as Moraea cooperi Baker
 Moraea ardesiaca Goldblatt, endemic
 Moraea arenaria Baker, accepted as Moraea serpentina Baker
 Moraea aristata (D.Delaroche) Asch. & Graebn. endemic
 Moraea aspera Goldblatt, endemic
 Moraea atropunctata Goldblatt, endemic
 Moraea australis (Goldblatt) Goldblatt, endemic
 Moraea autumnalis (Goldblatt) Goldblatt, endemic
 Moraea balenii Stent, accepted as Moraea spathulata (L.f.) Klatt
 Moraea barbigera Salisb. accepted as Moraea tricolor Andrews
 Moraea barkerae Goldblatt, endemic
 Moraea barnardiella Goldblatt, endemic
 Moraea barnardii L.Bolus, endemic
 Moraea baurii Baker, accepted as Moraea huttonii (Baker) Oberm.
 Moraea bellendenii (Sweet) N.E.Br. endemic
 Moraea bellendenii (Sweet) N.E.Br. subsp. cormifera Goldblatt, accepted as Moraea tricuspidata (L.f.) G.J.Lewis subsp. cormifera (Goldblatt) Goldblatt & J.C.Manning, indigenous
 Moraea bifida (L.Bolus) Goldblatt, endemic
 Moraea bipartita L.Bolus, endemic
 Moraea bituminosa (L.f.) Ker Gawl. endemic
 Moraea bolusii Baker, endemic
 Moraea brachygyne (Schltr.) Goldblatt, endemic
 Moraea brevistyla (Goldblatt) Goldblatt, indigenous
 Moraea brevituba (Goldblatt) Goldblatt, indigenous
 Moraea britteniae (L.Bolus) Goldblatt, endemic
 Moraea bubalina Goldblatt, endemic
 Moraea bulbifera Jacq. accepted as Moraea ramosissima (L.f.) Druce
 Moraea bulbillifera (G.J.Lewis) Goldblatt, indigenous
 Moraea bulbillifera (G.J.Lewis) Goldblatt subsp. anomala (Goldblatt) Goldblatt, endemic
 Moraea bulbillifera (G.J.Lewis) Goldblatt subsp. bulbillifera, endemic
 Moraea caeca Barnard ex Goldblatt, endemic
 Moraea caerulea Thunb. accepted as Aristea bracteata Pers.
 Moraea calcicola Goldblatt, endemic
 Moraea candida Baker, accepted as Moraea aristata (D.Delaroche) Asch. & Graebn.
 Moraea cantharophila Goldblatt & J.C.Manning, endemic
 Moraea carnea Goldblatt, endemic
 Moraea cedarmontana (Goldblatt) Goldblatt, endemic
 Moraea cedarmonticola Goldblatt, endemic
 Moraea ceresiana G.J.Lewis, accepted as Moraea unguiculata Ker Gawl.
 Moraea ciliata (L.f.) Ker Gawl. endemic
 Moraea ciliata (L.f.) Ker Gawl. subsp. ciliata, endemic
 Moraea ciliata (L.f.) Ker Gawl. subsp. cuprina Goldblatt & J.C.Manning, endemic
 Moraea ciliata (L.f.) Ker Gawl. subsp. lutescens Goldblatt & J.C.Manning, endemic
 Moraea ciliata (L.f.) Ker Gawl. var. barbigera (Salisb.) Baker, accepted as Moraea tricolor Andrews
 Moraea ciliata (L.f.) Ker Gawl. var. gracilis Baker, accepted as Moraea gracilenta Goldblatt
 Moraea ciliata (L.f.) Ker Gawl. var. tricolor (Andrews) Baker, accepted as Moraea tricolor Andrews
 Moraea citrina (G.J.Lewis) Goldblatt, endemic
 Moraea collina Thunb. endemic
 Moraea comptonii (L.Bolus) Goldblatt, endemic
 Moraea confusa G.J.Lewis, accepted as Moraea tricuspidata (L.f.) G.J.Lewis
 Moraea contorta Goldblatt, endemic
 Moraea cookii (L.Bolus) Goldblatt, indigenous
 Moraea cooperi Baker, endemic
 Moraea corniculata Lam. accepted as Moraea fugax (D.Delaroche) Jacq.
 Moraea crispa (L.f.) Ker Gawl. accepted as Moraea gawleri Spreng.
 Moraea crispa (L.f.) Ker Gawl. var. rectifolia Baker, accepted as Moraea gawleri Spreng.
 Moraea crispa Thunb. indigenous
 Moraea culmea Killick, accepted as Moraea trifida R.C.Foster
 Moraea cuspidata Goldblatt & J.C.Manning, indigenous
 Moraea debilis Goldblatt, endemic
 Moraea decipiens Goldblatt & J.C.Manning, indigenous
 Moraea decussata Klatt, accepted as Moraea gawleri Spreng.
 Moraea deltoidea Goldblatt & J.C.Manning, endemic
 Moraea demissa Goldblatt, endemic
 Moraea deserticola Goldblatt, endemic
 Moraea diphylla Baker, accepted as Moraea filicaulis Baker
 Moraea doleritica Goldblatt & J.C.Manning, endemic
 Moraea dracomontana Goldblatt, indigenous
 Moraea duthieana L.Bolus, accepted as Moraea tricolor Andrews
 Moraea eburnea Goldblatt & J.C.Manning, endemic
 Moraea edulis (L.f.) Ker Gawl. [1], accepted as Moraea fugax (D.Delaroche) Jacq.
 Moraea edulis L.f. var. gracilis Baker, accepted as Moraea gracilenta Goldblatt
 Moraea elegans Jacq. endemic
 Moraea elliotii Baker, indigenous
 Moraea elsiae Goldblatt, endemic
 Moraea exiliflora Goldblatt, endemic
 Moraea exilis N.E.Br. accepted as Moraea marionae N.E.Br.
 Moraea falcifolia Klatt, indigenous
 Moraea fasciculata Klatt, accepted as Moraea falcifolia Klatt
 Moraea fenestralis (Goldblatt & E.G.H.Oliv.) Goldblatt, endemic
 Moraea fenestrata (Goldblatt) Goldblatt, endemic
 Moraea fergusoniae L.Bolus, endemic
 Moraea ferrariola Jacq. accepted as Ferraria ferrariola (Jacq.) Willd.
 Moraea filamentosa Goldblatt & J.C.Manning, endemic
 Moraea filicaulis Baker, endemic
 Moraea fimbriata Klatt, accepted as Moraea fergusoniae L.Bolus
 Moraea fistulosa (Goldblatt) Goldblatt, endemic
 Moraea flaccida (Sweet) Steud. endemic
 Moraea flava Goldblatt & J.C.Manning, endemic
 Moraea flavescens (Goldblatt) Goldblatt, endemic
 Moraea flexicaulis Goldblatt, endemic
 Moraea flexuosa Goldblatt, accepted as Moraea flexicaulis Goldblatt
 Moraea fragrans Goldblatt, endemic
 Moraea framesii L.Bolus, accepted as Moraea serpentina Baker
 Moraea fugacissima (L.f.) Goldblatt, endemic
 Moraea fugax (D.Delaroche) Jacq. endemic
 Moraea fugax (D.Delaroche) Jacq. subsp. filicaulis (Baker) Goldblatt, accepted as Moraea filicaulis Baker, endemic
 Moraea fugax (D.Delaroche) Jacq. subsp. fugax, accepted as Moraea fugax (D.Delaroche) Jacq. endemic
 Moraea fusca Baker, accepted as Moraea lurida Ker Gawl.
 Moraea fuscomontana (Goldblatt) Goldblatt, endemic
 Moraea galaxia (L.f.) Goldblatt & J.C.Manning, endemic
 Moraea galaxioides Baker, accepted as Moraea falcifolia Klatt
 Moraea galpinii (Baker) N.E.Br. indigenous
 Moraea galpinii (Baker) N.E.Br. subsp. robusta Goldblatt, accepted as Moraea robusta (Goldblatt) Goldblatt
 Moraea gawleri Spreng. endemic
 Moraea geminifolia Goldblatt & J.C.Manning, indigenous
 Moraea gigandra L.Bolus, endemic
 Moraea glaucopis (DC.) Drapiez, accepted as Moraea aristata (D.Delaroche) Asch. & Graebn.
 Moraea glutinosa Baker, accepted as Ferraria glutinosa (Baker) Rendle
 Moraea gracilenta Goldblatt, endemic
 Moraea graminicola Oberm. indigenous
 Moraea graminicola Oberm. subsp. graminicola, endemic
 Moraea graminicola Oberm. subsp. notata Goldblatt, endemic
 Moraea grandis Goldblatt & J.C.Manning, endemic
 Moraea hainebachiana Goldblatt & J.C.Manning, indigenous
 Moraea hantamensis Klatt, accepted as Moraea ciliata (L.f.) Ker Gawl.
 Moraea helicoidea Goldblatt & J.C.Manning, endemic
 Moraea helmei Goldblatt & J.C.Manning, indigenous
 Moraea herrei (L.Bolus) Goldblatt, endemic
 Moraea hesperantha (Goldblatt) Goldblatt, endemic
 Moraea hiemalis Goldblatt, endemic
 Moraea hirsuta (Licht. ex Roem. & Schult.) Ker Gawl. accepted as Moraea papilionacea (L.f.) Ker Gawl.
 Moraea huttonii (Baker) Oberm. indigenous
 Moraea inclinata Goldblatt, indigenous
 Moraea inconspicua Goldblatt, endemic
 Moraea inconspicua Goldblatt subsp. inconspicua, endemic
 Moraea inconspicua Goldblatt subsp. namaquensis Goldblatt & J.C.Manning, endemic
 Moraea incurva G.J.Lewis, endemic
 Moraea indecora Goldblatt, endemic
 Moraea insolens Goldblatt, endemic
 Moraea intermedia Goldblatt & J.C.Manning, indigenous
 Moraea iridioides L. accepted as Dietes iridioides (L.) Sweet ex Klatt
 Moraea iriopetala L.f. accepted as Moraea vegeta L.
 Moraea jarmilae Halda, accepted as Moraea albicuspa Goldblatt
 Moraea juncifolia N.E.Br. accepted as Moraea elliotii Baker
 Moraea kamiesensis Goldblatt, endemic
 Moraea kamiesmontana (Goldblatt) Goldblatt, endemic
 Moraea karroica Goldblatt, endemic
 Moraea knersvlaktensis Goldblatt, endemic
 Moraea lazulina Goldblatt & J.C.Manning, endemic
 Moraea lewisiae (Goldblatt) Goldblatt, indigenous
 Moraea lewisiae (Goldblatt) Goldblatt subsp. lewisiae, endemic
 Moraea lewisiae (Goldblatt) Goldblatt subsp. secunda (Goldblatt) Goldblatt, endemic
 Moraea lilacina Goldblatt & J.C.Manning, endemic
 Moraea linderi Goldblatt, endemic
 Moraea longiaristata Goldblatt, endemic
 Moraea longiflora Ker Gawl. endemic
 Moraea longifolia (Jacq.) Pers. endemic
 Moraea longifolia (Schneev.) Sweet, accepted as Moraea fugax (D.Delaroche) Jacq.
 Moraea longipes Goldblatt & J.C.Manning, endemic
 Moraea longispatha Klatt, accepted as Moraea spathulata (L.f.) Klatt
 Moraea longistyla (Goldblatt) Goldblatt, endemic
 Moraea loubseri Goldblatt, endemic
 Moraea louisabolusiae Goldblatt, endemic
 Moraea lugubris (Salisb.) Goldblatt, endemic
 Moraea lurida Ker Gawl. endemic
 Moraea luteoalba (Goldblatt) Goldblatt, endemic
 Moraea macgregorii Goldblatt, endemic
 Moraea macra Schltr. accepted as Moraea elliotii Baker
 Moraea macrocarpa Goldblatt, endemic
 Moraea macrochlamys Baker, accepted as Moraea ciliata (L.f.) Ker Gawl.
 Moraea macronyx G.J.Lewis, endemic
 Moraea margaretae Goldblatt, endemic
 Moraea marginata J.C.Manning & Goldblatt, endemic
 Moraea marionae N.E.Br. indigenous
 Moraea marlothii (L.Bolus) Goldblatt, endemic
 Moraea maximiliani (Schltr.) Goldblatt & J.C.Manning, endemic
 Moraea melanops Goldblatt & J.C.Manning, endemic
 Moraea miniata Andrews, endemic
 Moraea minima Goldblatt, endemic
 Moraea minor Eckl. endemic
 Moraea mira Klatt, accepted as Moraea lugubris (Salisb.) Goldblatt
 Moraea modesta Killick, indigenous
 Moraea moggii N.E.Br. indigenous
 Moraea moggii N.E.Br. subsp. albescens Goldblatt, endemic
 Moraea moggii N.E.Br. subsp. moggii, endemic
 Moraea monophylla Baker, accepted as Moraea mutila (C.H.Bergius ex Eckl.) Goldblatt & J.C.Manning
 Moraea montana Schltr. accepted as Moraea lurida Ker Gawl.
 Moraea monticola Goldblatt, endemic
 Moraea mossii N.E.Br. accepted as Moraea stricta Baker
 Moraea muddii N.E.Br. endemic
 Moraea mutila (C.H.Bergius ex Eckl.) Goldblatt & J.C.Manning, indigenous
 Moraea namaquamontana Goldblatt, endemic
 Moraea namaquana (Goldblatt) Goldblatt, endemic
 Moraea namibensis Goldblatt, indigenous
 Moraea nana (L.Bolus) Goldblatt & J.C.Manning, endemic
 Moraea natalensis Baker, indigenous
 Moraea neglecta G.J.Lewis, endemic
 Moraea neopavonia R.C.Foster, accepted as Moraea tulbaghensis L.Bolus
 Moraea nubigena Goldblatt, endemic
 Moraea obtusa N.E.Br. accepted as Moraea angusta (Thunb.) Ker Gawl.
 Moraea ochroleuca (Salisb.) Drapiez, endemic
 Moraea odora Salisb. accepted as Moraea fugax (D.Delaroche) Jacq.
 Moraea odorata G.J.Lewis, accepted as Moraea viscaria (L.f.) Ker Gawl.
 Moraea ogamana Goldblatt & J.C.Manning, indigenous
 Moraea orthrosantha Goldblatt & J.C.Manning, endemic
 Moraea ovalifolia Goldblatt, accepted as Moraea galaxia (L.f.) Goldblatt & J.C.Manning
 Moraea ovata Thunb. accepted as Ferraria ovata (Thunb.) Goldblatt & J.C.Manning
 Moraea pallida (Baker) Goldblatt, indigenous
 Moraea papilionacea (L.f.) Ker Gawl. endemic
 Moraea papilionacea (L.f.) Ker Gawl. subsp. glabrescens Goldblatt & J.C.Manning, endemic
 Moraea papilionacea (L.f.) Ker Gawl. subsp. papilionacea, endemic
 Moraea papilionacea (L.f.) Ker Gawl. var. maythamiae G.J.Lewis, accepted as Moraea papilionacea (L.f.) Ker Gawl.
 Moraea parva N.E.Br. accepted as Moraea stricta Baker
 Moraea parviflora N.E.Br. accepted as Moraea natalensis Baker
 Moraea patens (Goldblatt) Goldblatt, endemic
 Moraea pavonia (L.f.) Ker Gawl. accepted as Moraea flexicaulis Goldblatt
 Moraea pavonia (L.f.) Ker Gawl. var. lutea (Ker Gawl.) Baker, accepted as Moraea bellendenii (Sweet) N.E.Br.
 Moraea pavonia (L.f.) Ker Gawl. var. villosa (Ker Gawl.) Baker, accepted as Moraea villosa (Ker Gawl.) Ker Gawl. subsp. villosa
 Moraea pearsonii Goldblatt & J.C.Manning, endemic
 Moraea pendula (Goldblatt) Goldblatt, endemic
 Moraea petricola Goldblatt & J.C.Manning, endemic
 Moraea pilifolia Goldblatt, endemic
 Moraea pilosa J.C.Wendl. accepted as Moraea papilionacea (L.f.) Ker Gawl.
 Moraea plumaria (Thunb.) Ker Gawl. accepted as Moraea lugubris (Salisb.) Goldblatt
 Moraea polyanthos L.f. endemic
 Moraea polystachya (Thunb.) Ker Gawl. indigenous
 Moraea polystachya (Thunb.) Ker Gawl. var. brevicaulis Stent, accepted as Moraea venenata Dinter
 Moraea pritzeliana Diels, endemic
 Moraea pseudospicata Goldblatt, endemic
 Moraea pubiflora N.E.Br. indigenous
 Moraea pubiflora N.E.Br. subsp. brevistyla Goldblatt, accepted as Moraea brevistyla (Goldblatt) Goldblatt
 Moraea punctata Baker, accepted as Moraea mutila (C.H.Bergius ex Eckl.) Goldblatt & J.C.Manning, indigenous
 Moraea pyrophila Goldblatt, endemic
 Moraea quartzicola Goldblatt & J.C.Manning, indigenous
 Moraea radians (Goldblatt) Goldblatt, endemic
 Moraea ramosa (Thunb.) Ker Gawl. accepted as Moraea ramosissima (L.f.) Druce
 Moraea ramosissima (L.f.) Druce, endemic
 Moraea reflexa Goldblatt, endemic
 Moraea regalis Goldblatt & J.C.Manning, endemic
 Moraea reticulata Goldblatt, endemic
 Moraea riparia (Goldblatt) Goldblatt, endemic
 Moraea rivularis Schltr. accepted as Moraea huttonii (Baker) Oberm.
 Moraea rivulicola Goldblatt & J.C.Manning, endemic
 Moraea robusta (Goldblatt) Goldblatt, endemic
 Moraea rogersii N.E.Br. accepted as Moraea trifida R.C.Foster
 Moraea saldanhensis Goldblatt & J.C.Manning, indigenous
 Moraea saxicola Goldblatt, endemic
 Moraea schlechteri (L.Bolus) Goldblatt, endemic
 Moraea serpentina Baker, endemic
 Moraea serratostyla (Goldblatt) Goldblatt, endemic
 Moraea setifolia (L.f.) Druce, endemic
 Moraea simplex Goldblatt & J.C.Manning, endemic
 Moraea simulans Baker, indigenous
 Moraea singularis Goldblatt & J.C.Manning, endemic
 Moraea sordescens Jacq. accepted as Moraea vegeta L.
 Moraea spathacea (Thunb.) Ker Gawl. accepted as Moraea spathulata (L.f.) Klatt
 Moraea spathacea (Thunb.) Ker Gawl. var. galpinii Baker, accepted as Moraea galpinii (Baker) N.E.Br.
 Moraea spathulata (L.f.) Klatt, indigenous
 Moraea spathulata (L.f.) Klatt subsp. autumnalis Goldblatt, accepted as Moraea spathulata (L.f.) Klatt
 Moraea spathulata (L.f.) Klatt subsp. saxosa Goldblatt, accepted as Moraea spathulata (L.f.) Klatt
 Moraea spathulata (L.f.) Klatt subsp. transvaalensis Goldblatt, accepted as Moraea spathulata (L.f.) Klatt
 Moraea speciosa (L.Bolus) Goldblatt, endemic
 Moraea stagnalis (Goldblatt) Goldblatt, endemic
 Moraea stenocarpa Schltr. accepted as Moraea cooperi Baker
 Moraea stewartae N.E.Br. accepted as Moraea elliotii Baker
 Moraea striata Goldblatt & J.C.Manning, endemic
 Moraea stricta Baker, indigenous
 Moraea sulphurea Baker, accepted as Moraea gawleri Spreng.
 Moraea tanquana Goldblatt & J.C.Manning, endemic
 Moraea tenuis Ker Gawl. accepted as Moraea unguiculata Ker Gawl.
 Moraea teretifolia Goldblatt & J.C.Manning, indigenous
 Moraea thomasiae Goldblatt, endemic
 Moraea thomsonii Baker, indigenous
 Moraea tortilis Goldblatt, endemic
 Moraea toxicaria Dinter, accepted as Moraea venenata Dinter
 Moraea tricolor Andrews, endemic
 Moraea tricuspidata (L.f.) G.J.Lewis, endemic
 Moraea tricuspidata (L.f.) G.J.Lewis subsp. cormifera (Goldblatt) Goldblatt & J.C.Manning, endemic
 Moraea tricuspidata (L.f.) G.J.Lewis subsp. parviflora Goldblatt & J.C.Manning, endemic
 Moraea tricuspidata (L.f.) G.J.Lewis subsp. tricuspidata, endemic
 Moraea tricuspis (Thunb.) Ker Gawl. accepted as Moraea tricuspidata (L.f.) G.J.Lewis
 Moraea tricuspis (Thunb.) Ker Gawl. var. lutea Ker Gawl. accepted as Moraea bellendenii (Sweet) N.E.Br.
 Moraea tricuspis (Thunb.) Ker Gawl. var. ocellata D.Don, accepted as Moraea aristata (D.Delaroche) Asch. & Graebn.
 Moraea trifida R.C.Foster, indigenous
 Moraea tripetala (L.f.) Ker Gawl. endemic
 Moraea tripetala (L.f.) Ker Gawl. subsp. jacquiniana (Schltr. ex G.J.Lewis) Goldblatt & J.C.Manning, indigenous
 Moraea tripetala (L.f.) Ker Gawl. subsp. tripetala, indigenous
 Moraea tripetala (L.f.) Ker Gawl. subsp. violacea Goldblatt & J.C.Manning, indigenous
 Moraea tripetala (L.f.) Ker Gawl. var. jacquiniana Schltr. ex G.J.Lewis, accepted as Moraea tripetala (L.f.) Ker Gawl. subsp. jacquiniana (Schltr. ex G.J.Lewis) Goldblatt & J.C.Manning
 Moraea tristis (L.f.) Ker Gawl. accepted as Moraea vegeta L.
 Moraea trita N.E.Br. accepted as Moraea stricta Baker
 Moraea tulbaghensis L.Bolus, endemic
 Moraea umbellata Thunb. endemic
 Moraea undulata (L.) Thunb. accepted as Ferraria crispa Burm.
 Moraea undulata Ker Gawl. accepted as Moraea gawleri Spreng.
 Moraea unguicularis Lam. accepted as Tritoniopsis unguicularis (Lam.) G.J.Lewis
 Moraea unguiculata Ker Gawl. endemic
 Moraea unibracteata Goldblatt, endemic
 Moraea vallisavium Goldblatt, endemic
 Moraea vallisbelli (Goldblatt) Goldblatt, endemic
 Moraea variabilis (G.J.Lewis) Goldblatt, endemic
 Moraea vegeta L. endemic
 Moraea venenata Dinter, indigenous
 Moraea verecunda Goldblatt, endemic
 Moraea versicolor (Salisb. ex Klatt) Goldblatt, endemic
 Moraea vespertina Goldblatt & J.C.Manning, endemic
 Moraea vigilans Goldblatt & J.C.Manning, endemic
 Moraea villosa (Ker Gawl.) Ker Gawl. indigenous
 Moraea villosa (Ker Gawl.) Ker Gawl. subsp. elandsmontana Goldblatt, endemic
 Moraea villosa (Ker Gawl.) Ker Gawl. subsp. villosa, endemic
 Moraea violacea Baker, accepted as Moraea elliotii Baker
 Moraea violacea L.Bolus, accepted as Moraea unguiculata Ker Gawl.
 Moraea virgata Jacq. indigenous
 Moraea virgata Jacq. subsp. karooica (Goldblatt) Goldblatt, endemic
 Moraea virgata Jacq. subsp. virgata, endemic
 Moraea viscaria (L.f.) Ker Gawl. endemic
 Moraea viscaria (L.f.) Ker Gawl. var. bituminosa (L.f.) Baker, accepted as Moraea bituminosa (L.f.) Ker Gawl.
 Moraea vlokii Goldblatt, endemic
 Moraea vuvuzela Goldblatt & J.C.Manning, indigenous
 Moraea worcesterensis Goldblatt, endemic

Morphixia 
Genus Morphixia:
 Morphixia angustifolia (Andrews) Klatt, accepted as Ixia monadelpha D.Delaroche, indigenous
 Morphixia aulica (Aiton) Ker Gawl. accepted as Ixia latifolia D.Delaroche, indigenous
 Morphixia capillaris (L.f.) Ker Gawl. accepted as Ixia capillaris L.f. indigenous
 Morphixia capillaris (L.f.) Ker Gawl. var. incarnata (Jacq.) Baker, accepted as Ixia latifolia D.Delaroche, indigenous
 Morphixia capillaris (L.f.) Ker Gawl. var. lancea (Jacq.) Baker, accepted as Ixia marginifolia Salisb. ex G.J.Lewis, indigenous
 Morphixia columellaris (Ker Gawl.) Klatt, accepted as Ixia monadelpha D.Delaroche, indigenous
 Morphixia curta (Andrews) Klatt, accepted as Ixia curta Andrews, indigenous
 Morphixia grandiflora (Andrews) Klatt, accepted as Ixia monadelpha D.Delaroche, indigenous
 Morphixia incarnata (Andrews) Ker Gawl. accepted as Ixia latifolia D.Delaroche, indigenous
 Morphixia lancea (Jacq.) Klatt, accepted as Ixia marginifolia Salisb. ex G.J.Lewis, indigenous
 Morphixia latifolia (Andrews) Klatt, accepted as Ixia monadelpha D.Delaroche, indigenous
 Morphixia monadelpha (D.Delaroche) Klatt, accepted as Ixia monadelpha D.Delaroche, indigenous
 Morphixia odorata (Ker Gawl.) Baker, accepted as Ixia odorata Ker Gawl. indigenous
 Morphixia paniculata (D.Delaroche) Baker, accepted as Ixia paniculata D.Delaroche, indigenous
 Morphixia paniculata (D.Delaroche) Baker var. rochensis (Ker Gawl.) Baker, accepted as Ixia bellendenii R.C.Foster, indigenous
 Morphixia paniculata (D.Delaroche) Baker var. tenuiflora (Vahl) Baker, accepted as Ixia paniculata D.Delaroche, indigenous
 Morphixia purpurea (Andrews) Klatt, accepted as Ixia monadelpha D.Delaroche, indigenous
 Morphixia versicolor (Andrews) Klatt, accepted as Ixia monadelpha D.Delaroche, indigenous

Nivenia 
Genus Nivenia:
 Nivenia argentea Goldblatt, endemic
 Nivenia binata Klatt, endemic
 Nivenia capitata (Klatt) Weim. accepted as Nivenia argentea Goldblatt
 Nivenia concinna N.E.Br. endemic
 Nivenia corymbosa (Ker Gawl.) Baker, endemic
 Nivenia dispar N.E.Br. endemic
 Nivenia fruticosa (L.f.) Baker, endemic
 Nivenia inaequalis Goldblatt & J.C.Manning, endemic
 Nivenia levynsiae Weim. endemic
 Nivenia parviflora Goldblatt, endemic
 Nivenia stenosiphon Goldblatt, endemic
 Nivenia stokoei (L.Guthrie) N.E.Br. endemic

Nymanina 
Genus Nymanina:
 Nymanina leichtlinii (Klatt) Kuntze, accepted as Freesia leichtlinii Klatt subsp. leichtlinii
 Nymanina refracta (Jacq.) Kuntze, accepted as Freesia refracta (Jacq.) Klatt

Ovieda 
Genus Ovieda:
 Ovieda aculeata (Sweet) Klatt, accepted as Lapeirousia fabricii (D.Delaroche) Ker Gawl.
 Ovieda corymbosa (L.) Spreng. accepted as Codonorhiza corymbosa (L.) Goldblatt & J.C.Manning
 Ovieda falcata (L.f.) Spreng. accepted as Codonorhiza falcata (L.f.) Goldblatt & J.C.Manning
 Ovieda fasciculata (Ker Gawl.) Spreng. accepted as Lapeirousia plicata (Jacq.) Diels subsp. plicata
 Ovieda fistulosa Spreng. ex Klatt, accepted as Xenoscapa fistulosa (Spreng. ex Klatt) Goldblatt & J.C.Manning
 Ovieda micrantha E.Mey. ex Klatt, accepted as Codonorhiza micrantha (E.Mey. ex Klatt) Goldblatt & J.C.Manning
 Ovieda purpureo-lutea Klatt, accepted as Lapeirousia fastigiata (Lam.) Ker Gawl.
 Ovieda silenoides (Jacq.) Spreng. accepted as Lapeirousia silenoides (Jacq.) Ker Gawl.

Peyrousia 
Genus Peyrousia:
 Peyrousia falcata (L.f.) Sweet, accepted as Codonorhiza falcata (L.f.) Goldblatt & J.C.Manning
 Peyrousia fasciculata (Ker Gawl.) Sweet, accepted as Lapeirousia plicata (Jacq.) Diels subsp. plicata
 Peyrousia silenoides (Jacq.) Sweet, accepted as Lapeirousia silenoides (Jacq.) Ker Gawl.

Pillansia 
Genus Pillansia:
 Pillansia templemannii (Baker) L.Bolus, endemic

Psilosiphon 
Genus Psilosiphon:
 Psilosiphon bainesii (Baker) Goldblatt & J.C.Manning, accepted as Afrosolen bainesii (Baker) Goldblatt & J.C.Manning, indigenous
 Psilosiphon masukuensis (Vaupel & Schltr.) Goldblatt & J.C.Manning, accepted as Afrosolen masukuensis (Vaupel & Schltr.) Goldblatt & J.C.Manning, indigenous
 Psilosiphon sandersonii (Baker) Goldblatt & J.C.Manning, accepted as Afrosolen sandersonii (Baker) Goldblatt & J.C.Manning, indigenous
 Psilosiphon sandersonii (Baker) Goldblatt & J.C.Manning subsp. limpopoensis Goldblatt & J.C.Manning, accepted as Afrosolen sandersonii (Baker) Goldblatt & J.C.Manning subsp. limpopoensis (Goldblatt & J.C.Manning), indigenous

Radinosiphon 
Genus Radinosiphon:
 Radinosiphon leptostachya (Baker) N.E.Br. indigenous
 Radinosiphon lomatensis (N.E.Br.) N.E.Br. endemic

Rheome 
Genus Rheome:
 Rheome maximiliani (Schltr.) Goldblatt, accepted as Moraea maximiliani (Schltr.) Goldblatt & J.C.Manning
 Rheome umbellata (Thunb.) Goldblatt, accepted as Moraea umbellata Thunb.

Roggeveldia 
Genus Roggeveldia:
 Roggeveldia fistulosa Goldblatt, accepted as Moraea fistulosa (Goldblatt) Goldblatt
 Roggeveldia montana Goldblatt, accepted as Moraea monticola Goldblatt

Romulea 
Genus Romulea:
 Romulea albiflora J.C.Manning & Goldblatt, endemic
 Romulea albomarginata M.P.de Vos, endemic
 Romulea alticola J.C.Manning & Goldblatt, indigenous
 Romulea amoena Schltr. ex Beg. accepted as Romulea pudica (Sol. ex Ker Gawl.) Baker, endemic
 Romulea aquatica G.J.Lewis, endemic
 Romulea atrandra G.J.Lewis, indigenous
 Romulea atrandra G.J.Lewis var. atrandra, endemic
 Romulea atrandra G.J.Lewis var. esterhuyseniae M.P.de Vos, endemic
 Romulea atrandra G.J.Lewis var. lewisiae M.P.de Vos, endemic
 Romulea austinii E.Phillips, endemic
 Romulea autumnalis L.Bolus, endemic
 Romulea barkerae M.P.de Vos, endemic
 Romulea biflora (Beg.) M.P.de Vos, endemic
 Romulea camerooniana Baker, indigenous
 Romulea campanuloides Harms var. campanuloides, accepted as Romulea camerooniana Baker
 Romulea campanuloides Harms var. gigantea M.P.de Vos, accepted as Romulea camerooniana Baker
 Romulea cedarbergensis M.P.de Vos, endemic
 Romulea citrina Baker, endemic
 Romulea collina J.C.Manning & Goldblatt, endemic
 Romulea cruciata (Jacq.) Baker, indigenous
 Romulea cruciata (Jacq.) Baker var. cruciata, endemic
 Romulea cruciata (Jacq.) Baker var. intermedia (Beg.) M.P.de Vos, endemic
 Romulea dichotoma (Thunb.) Baker, endemic
 Romulea discifera J.C.Manning & Goldblatt, endemic
 Romulea diversiformis M.P.de Vos, endemic
 Romulea eburnea J.C.Manning & Goldblatt, endemic
 Romulea elliptica M.P.de Vos, endemic
 Romulea eximia M.P.de Vos, endemic
 Romulea fibrosa M.P.de Vos, endemic
 Romulea flava (Lam.) M.P.de Vos, indigenous
 Romulea flava (Lam.) M.P.de Vos var. flava, endemic
 Romulea flava (Lam.) M.P.de Vos var. hirsuta (Beg.) M.P.de Vos, endemic
 Romulea flava (Lam.) M.P.de Vos var. minor (Beg.) M.P.de Vos, endemic
 Romulea flava (Lam.) M.P.de Vos var. viridiflora (Beg.) M.P.de Vos, endemic
 Romulea flexuosa Klatt, endemic
 Romulea gigantea Beg. endemic
 Romulea gracillima Baker, endemic
 Romulea hallii M.P.de Vos, endemic
 Romulea hantamensis (Diels) Goldblatt, endemic
 Romulea hirsuta (Steud. ex Klatt) Baker, indigenous
 Romulea hirsuta (Steud. ex Klatt) Baker var. cuprea (Beg.) M.P.de Vos, endemic
 Romulea hirsuta (Steud. ex Klatt) Baker var. framesii (L.Bolus) M.P.de Vos, endemic
 Romulea hirsuta (Steud. ex Klatt) Baker var. hirsuta, endemic
 Romulea hirsuta (Steud. ex Klatt) Baker var. zeyheri (Baker) M.P.de Vos, endemic
 Romulea hirta Schltr. endemic
 Romulea jugicola M.P.de Vos, endemic
 Romulea kamisensis M.P.de Vos, endemic
 Romulea komsbergensis M.P.de Vos, endemic
 Romulea leipoldtii Marais, endemic
 Romulea lilacina J.C.Manning & Goldblatt, endemic
 Romulea longipes Schltr. endemic
 Romulea lutea J.C.Manning & Goldblatt, endemic
 Romulea luteoflora (M.P.de Vos) M.P.de Vos, indigenous
 Romulea luteoflora (M.P.de Vos) M.P.de Vos var. luteoflora, endemic
 Romulea macowanii Baker, indigenous
 Romulea macowanii Baker var. alticola (B.L.Burtt) M.P.de Vos, indigenous
 Romulea macowanii Baker var. macowanii, indigenous
 Romulea macowanii Baker var. oreophila M.P.de Vos, indigenous
 Romulea maculata J.C.Manning & Goldblatt, endemic
 Romulea malaniae M.P.de Vos, endemic
 Romulea membranacea M.P.de Vos, endemic
 Romulea minutiflora Klatt, endemic
 Romulea monadelpha (Sweet) Baker, endemic
 Romulea monophylla J.C.Manning & Goldblatt, indigenous
 Romulea montana Schltr. ex Beg. endemic
 Romulea monticola M.P.de Vos, endemic
 Romulea multifida M.P.de Vos, endemic
 Romulea multisulcata M.P.de Vos, endemic
 Romulea namaquensis M.P.de Vos, endemic
 Romulea neglecta (Schult.) M.P.de Vos, accepted as Romulea speciosa (Ker Gawl.) Baker, endemic
 Romulea obscura Klatt, indigenous
 Romulea obscura Klatt var. blanda M.P.de Vos, endemic
 Romulea obscura Klatt var. campestris M.P.de Vos, endemic
 Romulea obscura Klatt var. obscura, endemic
 Romulea obscura Klatt var. subtestacea M.P.de Vos, endemic
 Romulea papyracea Wolley-Dod, accepted as Romulea schlechteri Beg.
 Romulea pearsonii M.P.de Vos, endemic
 Romulea pilosa J.C.Manning & Goldblatt, indigenous
 Romulea pratensis M.P.de Vos, endemic
 Romulea pudica (Sol. ex Ker Gawl.) Baker, endemic
 Romulea quartzicola J.C.Manning & Goldblatt, indigenous
 Romulea rosea (L.) Eckl. indigenous
 Romulea rosea (L.) Eckl. var. australis (Ewart) M.P.de Vos, endemic
 Romulea rosea (L.) Eckl. var. communis M.P.de Vos, endemic
 Romulea rosea (L.) Eckl. var. elegans (Klatt) Beg. endemic
 Romulea rosea (L.) Eckl. var. reflexa (Eckl.) Beg. accepted as Romulea flava (Lam.) M.P.de Vos var. flava, endemic
 Romulea rosea (L.) Eckl. var. rosea, endemic
 Romulea rupestris J.C.Manning & Goldblatt, endemic
 Romulea sabulosa Schltr. ex Beg. endemic
 Romulea saldanhensis M.P.de Vos, endemic
 Romulea sanguinalis M.P.de Vos, endemic
 Romulea saxatilis M.P.de Vos, endemic
 Romulea schlechteri Beg. endemic
 Romulea setifolia N.E.Br. indigenous
 Romulea setifolia N.E.Br. var. aggregata M.P.de Vos, endemic
 Romulea setifolia N.E.Br. var. belviderica M.P.de Vos, endemic
 Romulea setifolia N.E.Br. var. ceresiana M.P.de Vos, endemic
 Romulea setifolia N.E.Br. var. setifolia, endemic
 Romulea singularis J.C.Manning & Goldblatt, endemic
 Romulea sinispinosensis M.P.de Vos, endemic
 Romulea sladenii M.P.de Vos, endemic
 Romulea speciosa (Ker Gawl.) Baker, indigenous
 Romulea sphaerocarpa M.P.de Vos, endemic
 Romulea stellata M.P.de Vos, endemic
 Romulea subfistulosa M.P.de Vos, endemic
 Romulea sulphurea Beg. endemic
 Romulea syringodeoflora M.P.de Vos, endemic
 Romulea tabularis Eckl. ex Beg. endemic
 Romulea tetragona M.P.de Vos, indigenous
 Romulea tetragona M.P.de Vos var. flavandra M.P.de Vos, endemic
 Romulea tetragona M.P.de Vos var. tetragona, endemic
 Romulea tortilis Baker, indigenous
 Romulea tortilis Baker var. dissecta M.P.de Vos, endemic
 Romulea tortilis Baker var. tortilis, endemic
 Romulea tortuosa (Licht. ex Roem. & Schult.) Baker, indigenous
 Romulea tortuosa (Licht. ex Roem. & Schult.) Baker subsp. aurea (Klatt) M.P.de Vos, endemic
 Romulea tortuosa (Licht. ex Roem. & Schult.) Baker subsp. depauperata M.P.de Vos, endemic
 Romulea tortuosa (Licht. ex Roem. & Schult.) Baker subsp. tortuosa, endemic
 Romulea toximontana M.P.de Vos, endemic
 Romulea triflora (Burm.f.) N.E.Br. endemic
 Romulea tubulosa J.C.Manning & Goldblatt, indigenous
 Romulea unifolia M.P.de Vos, endemic
 Romulea vanzyliae M.P.de Vos, accepted as Romulea subfistulosa M.P.de Vos
 Romulea vinacea M.P.de Vos, endemic
 Romulea viridibracteata M.P.de Vos, endemic
 Romulea vlokii M.P.de Vos, endemic

Schizorhiza 
Genus Schizorhiza:
 Schizorhiza neglecta (Goldblatt) Goldblatt & J.C.Manning, indigenous

Schizostylis 
Genus Schizostylis:
 Schizostylis coccinea Backh. & Harv. accepted as Hesperantha coccinea (Backh. & Harv.) Goldblatt & J.C.Manning

Sisyrinchium 
Genus Sisyrinchium:
 Sisyrinchium angustifolium Mill. not indigenous, invasive
 Sisyrinchium micranthum Cav. not indigenous

Sophronia 
Genus Sophronia:
 Sophronia fasciculata Licht. ex Roem. & Schult. accepted as Lapeirousia plicata (Jacq.) Diels subsp. plicata

Sparaxis 
Genus Sparaxis:
 Sparaxis auriculata Goldblatt & J.C.Manning, endemic
 Sparaxis bulbifera (L.) Ker Gawl. endemic
 Sparaxis calcicola Goldblatt & J.C.Manning, endemic
 Sparaxis caryophyllacea Goldblatt, endemic
 Sparaxis elegans (Sweet) Goldblatt, endemic
 Sparaxis fragrans (Jacq.) Ker Gawl. endemic
 Sparaxis galeata Ker Gawl. endemic
 Sparaxis grandiflora (D.Delaroche) Ker Gawl. indigenous
 Sparaxis grandiflora (D.Delaroche) Ker Gawl. subsp. acutiloba Goldblatt, endemic
 Sparaxis grandiflora (D.Delaroche) Ker Gawl. subsp. fimbriata (Lam.) Goldblatt, endemic
 Sparaxis grandiflora (D.Delaroche) Ker Gawl. subsp. grandiflora, endemic
 Sparaxis grandiflora (D.Delaroche) Ker Gawl. subsp. violacea (Eckl.) Goldblatt, endemic
 Sparaxis maculosa Goldblatt, endemic
 Sparaxis metelerkampiae (L.Bolus) Goldblatt & J.C.Manning, endemic
 Sparaxis parviflora (G.J.Lewis) Goldblatt, endemic
 Sparaxis pillansii L.Bolus, endemic
 Sparaxis roxburghii (Baker) Goldblatt, endemic
 Sparaxis tricolor (Schneev.) Ker Gawl. endemic
 Sparaxis variegata (Sweet) Goldblatt, endemic
 Sparaxis variegata (Sweet) Goldblatt subsp. metelerkampiae (L.Bolus) Goldblatt, accepted as Sparaxis metelerkampiae (L.Bolus) Goldblatt & J.C.Manning
 Sparaxis villosa (Burm.f.) Goldblatt, endemic

Syringodea 
Genus Syringodea:
 Syringodea bifucata M.P.de Vos, endemic
 Syringodea concolor (Baker) M.P.de Vos, endemic
 Syringodea derustensis M.P.de Vos, endemic
 Syringodea flanaganii Baker, endemic
 Syringodea longituba (Klatt) Kuntze var. longituba, accepted as Syringodea longituba (Klatt) Kuntze subsp. longituba, endemic
 Syringodea longituba (Klatt) Kuntze var. violacea M.P.de Vos, accepted as Syringodea longituba (Klatt) Kuntze subsp. violacea (M.P.de Vos) Goldblatt & J.C.Manning, endemic
 Syringodea pulchella Hook.f. endemic
 Syringodea saxatilis M.P.de Vos, endemic
 Syringodea unifolia Goldblatt, accepted as Afrocrocus unifolius (Goldblatt) Goldblatt & J.C.Manning, endemic

Thereianthus 
Genus Thereianthus:
 Thereianthus bracteolatus (Lam.) G.J.Lewis, endemic
 Thereianthus bulbiferus Goldblatt & J.C.Manning, indigenous
 Thereianthus elandsmontanus Goldblatt & J.C.Manning, indigenous
 Thereianthus intermedius J.C.Manning & Goldblatt, indigenous
 Thereianthus ixioides G.J.Lewis, endemic
 Thereianthus juncifolius (Baker) G.J.Lewis, endemic
 Thereianthus longicollis (Schltr.) G.J.Lewis, endemic
 Thereianthus minutus (Klatt) G.J.Lewis, endemic
 Thereianthus montanus J.C.Manning & Goldblatt, endemic
 Thereianthus racemosus (Klatt) G.J.Lewis, endemic
 Thereianthus spicatus (L.) G.J.Lewis, endemic
 Thereianthus spicatus (L.) G.J.Lewis var. linearifolius G.J.Lewis, accepted as Thereianthus spicatus (L.) G.J.Lewis

Tritonia 
Genus Tritonia:
 Tritonia atrorubens (N.E.Br.) L.Bolus, endemic
 Tritonia bakeri Klatt, indigenous
 Tritonia bakeri Klatt subsp. bakeri, endemic
 Tritonia bakeri Klatt subsp. lilacina (F.Bolus) M.P.de Vos, endemic
 Tritonia capensis (Houtt.) Ker Gawl. accepted as Ixia paniculata D.Delaroche, indigenous
 Tritonia cedarmontana Goldblatt & J.C.Manning, indigenous
 Tritonia chrysantha Fourc. endemic
 Tritonia concolor Sweet, accepted as Ixia paniculata D.Delaroche, indigenous
 Tritonia cooperi (Baker) Klatt, indigenous
 Tritonia cooperi (Baker) Klatt subsp. cooperi, endemic
 Tritonia cooperi (Baker) Klatt subsp. quadrialata M.P.de Vos, endemic
 Tritonia crispa (L.f.) Ker Gawl. var. crispa, accepted as Tritonia undulata (Burm.f.) Baker, endemic
 Tritonia crispa (L.f.) Ker Gawl. var. parviflora Baker, accepted as Tritonia undulata (Burm.f.) Baker, endemic
 Tritonia crocata (L.) Ker Gawl. endemic
 Tritonia delpierrei M.P.de Vos, accepted as Tritonia marlothii M.P.de Vos subsp. delpierrei (M.P.de Vos) M.P.de Vos, endemic
 Tritonia deusta (Aiton) Ker Gawl. indigenous
 Tritonia deusta (Aiton) Ker Gawl. subsp. deusta, endemic
 Tritonia deusta (Aiton) Ker Gawl. subsp. miniata (Jacq.) M.P.de Vos, endemic
 Tritonia disticha (Klatt) Baker, indigenous
 Tritonia disticha (Klatt) Baker subsp. disticha, endemic
 Tritonia disticha (Klatt) Baker subsp. rubrolucens (R.C.Foster) M.P.de Vos, indigenous
 Tritonia drakensbergensis M.P.de Vos, endemic
 Tritonia dubia Eckl. ex Klatt, endemic
 Tritonia flabellifolia (D.Delaroche) G.J.Lewis, indigenous
 Tritonia flabellifolia (D.Delaroche) G.J.Lewis var. flabellifolia, endemic
 Tritonia flabellifolia (D.Delaroche) G.J.Lewis var. major (Ker Gawl.) M.P.de Vos, endemic
 Tritonia flabellifolia (D.Delaroche) G.J.Lewis var. thomasiae M.P.de Vos, endemic
 Tritonia florentiae (Marloth) Goldblatt, endemic
 Tritonia gladiolaris (Lam.) Goldblatt & J.C.Manning, indigenous
 Tritonia kamisbergensis Klatt, endemic
 Tritonia karooica M.P.de Vos, endemic
 Tritonia lancea (Thunb.) N.E.Br. endemic
 Tritonia latifolia (D.Delaroche) N.E.Br. accepted as Ixia latifolia D.Delaroche, indigenous
 Tritonia laxifolia (Klatt) Benth. ex Baker, indigenous
 Tritonia linearifolia Goldblatt & J.C.Manning, endemic
 Tritonia lineata (Salisb.) Ker Gawl. accepted as Tritonia gladiolaris (Lam.) Goldblatt & J.C.Manning, indigenous
 Tritonia lineata (Salisb.) Ker Gawl. var. parvifolia M.P.de Vos, accepted as Tritonia gladiolaris (Lam.) Goldblatt & J.C.Manning, endemic
 Tritonia longiflora (P.J.Bergius) Ker Gawl. accepted as Ixia paniculata D.Delaroche, indigenous
 Tritonia marlothii M.P.de Vos, endemic
 Tritonia marlothii M.P.de Vos subsp. delpierrei (M.P.de Vos) M.P.de Vos, endemic
 Tritonia nelsonii Baker, indigenous
 Tritonia pallida Ker Gawl. indigenous
 Tritonia pallida Ker Gawl. subsp. pallida, endemic
 Tritonia pallida Ker Gawl. subsp. taylorae (L.Bolus) M.P.de Vos, endemic
 Tritonia paniculata (D.Delaroche) Klatt, accepted as Ixia paniculata D.Delaroche, indigenous
 Tritonia parvula N.E.Br. endemic
 Tritonia refracta (Jacq.) Ker Gawl. accepted as Freesia refracta (Jacq.) Klatt
 Tritonia rocheana Sweet, accepted as Ixia bellendenii R.C.Foster, indigenous
 Tritonia rochensis Ker Gawl. accepted as Ixia bellendenii R.C.Foster, indigenous
 Tritonia scillaris (L.) Baker, accepted as Ixia scillaris L. indigenous
 Tritonia scillaris var. stricta (Eckl. ex Klatt) Baker, accepted as Ixia stricta (Eckl. ex Klatt) G.J.Lewis, indigenous
 Tritonia securigera (Aiton) Ker Gawl. accepted as Tritonia securigera (Aiton) Ker Gawl. subsp. securigera, endemic
 Tritonia securigera (Aiton) Ker Gawl. subsp. securigera, endemic
 Tritonia securigera (Aiton) Ker Gawl. subsp. watermeyeri (L.Bolus) J.C.Manning & Goldblatt, endemic
 Tritonia squalida (Aiton) Ker Gawl. endemic
 Tritonia strictifolia (Klatt) Benth. & Hook.f. ex B.D.Jacks. endemic
 Tritonia tenuiflora (Vahl) Ker Gawl. accepted as Ixia paniculata D.Delaroche, indigenous
 Tritonia thunbergii N.E.Br. accepted as Ixia erubescens Goldblatt, indigenous
 Tritonia trinervata Baker, accepted as Ixia trinervata (Baker) G.J.Lewis, indigenous
 Tritonia tugwelliae L.Bolus, endemic
 Tritonia undulata (Burm.f.) Baker, endemic
 Tritonia viridis (Aiton) Ker Gawl. accepted as Freesia viridis (Aiton) Goldblatt & J.C.Manning subsp. viridis
 Tritonia watermeyeri L.Bolus, accepted as Tritonia securigera (Aiton) Ker Gawl. subsp. watermeyeri (L.Bolus) J.C.Manning & Goldblatt, endemic
 Tritonia xanthospila (DC.) Ker Gawl. ex Spreng. accepted as Freesia caryophyllacea (Burm.f.) N.E.Br.

Tritoniopsis 
Genus Tritoniopsis:
 Tritoniopsis antholyza (Poir.) Goldblatt, endemic
 Tritoniopsis bicolor J.C.Manning & Goldblatt, endemic
 Tritoniopsis burchellii (N.E.Br.) Goldblatt, endemic
 Tritoniopsis caffra (N.E.Br.) Goldblatt & J.C.Manning, endemic
 Tritoniopsis caledonensis (R.C.Foster) G.J.Lewis, endemic
 Tritoniopsis cinnamomea J.C.Manning & Goldblatt, endemic
 Tritoniopsis dodii (G.J.Lewis) G.J.Lewis, endemic
 Tritoniopsis elongata (L.Bolus) G.J.Lewis, endemic
 Tritoniopsis flava J.C.Manning & Goldblatt, endemic
 Tritoniopsis flexuosa (L.f.) G.J.Lewis, endemic
 Tritoniopsis intermedia (Baker) Goldblatt, endemic
 Tritoniopsis lata (L.Bolus) G.J.Lewis, indigenous
 Tritoniopsis lata (L.Bolus) G.J.Lewis var. lata, endemic
 Tritoniopsis lata (L.Bolus) G.J.Lewis var. longibracteata (L.Bolus) G.J.Lewis, endemic
 Tritoniopsis latifolia G.J.Lewis, endemic
 Tritoniopsis lesliei L.Bolus, endemic
 Tritoniopsis longituba (Fourc.) Goldblatt, accepted as Tritoniopsis antholyza (Poir.) Goldblatt
 Tritoniopsis nemorosa (E.Mey. ex Klatt) G.J.Lewis, endemic
 Tritoniopsis nervosa (Baker) G.J.Lewis, endemic
 Tritoniopsis parviflora (Jacq.) G.J.Lewis, indigenous
 Tritoniopsis parviflora (Jacq.) G.J.Lewis var. angusta (L.Bolus) G.J.Lewis, endemic
 Tritoniopsis parviflora (Jacq.) G.J.Lewis var. parviflora, endemic
 Tritoniopsis pulchella G.J.Lewis, indigenous
 Tritoniopsis pulchella G.J.Lewis var. alpina G.J.Lewis, endemic
 Tritoniopsis pulchella G.J.Lewis var. pulchella, endemic
 Tritoniopsis pulchra (Baker) Goldblatt, endemic
 Tritoniopsis ramosa (Eckl. ex Klatt) G.J.Lewis, indigenous
 Tritoniopsis ramosa (Eckl. ex Klatt) G.J.Lewis var. ramosa, endemic
 Tritoniopsis ramosa (Eckl. ex Klatt) G.J.Lewis var. robusta G.J.Lewis, endemic
 Tritoniopsis ramosa (Eckl. ex Klatt) G.J.Lewis var. unguiculata (Baker) G.J.Lewis, endemic
 Tritoniopsis revoluta (Burm.f.) Goldblatt, endemic
 Tritoniopsis toximontana J.C.Manning & Goldblatt, endemic
 Tritoniopsis triticea (Burm.f.) Goldblatt, endemic
 Tritoniopsis unguicularis (Lam.) G.J.Lewis, endemic
 Tritoniopsis williamsiana Goldblatt, endemic

Tritonixia 
Genus Tritonixia:
 Tritonixia conferta Klatt, accepted as Ixia stohriae L.Bolus, indigenous
 Tritonixia lineata (Salisb.) Klatt, accepted as Tritonia gladiolaris (Lam.) Goldblatt & J.C.Manning, indigenous
 Tritonixia scillaris (L.) Klatt, accepted as Ixia scillaris L. indigenous
 Tritonixia stricta Eckl. ex Klatt, accepted as Ixia stricta (Eckl. ex Klatt) G.J.Lewis, indigenous

Waitzia 
Genus Waitzia:
 Waitzia capensis (Houtt.) Rchb. accepted as Ixia paniculata D.Delaroche, indigenous
 Waitzia concolor (Sweet) Heynh. accepted as Ixia paniculata D.Delaroche, indigenous
 Waitzia odorata (Lodd.) Heynh. accepted as Freesia corymbosa (Burm.f.) N.E.Br.
 Waitzia rochensis (Ker Gawl.) Heynh. accepted as Ixia bellendenii R.C.Foster, indigenous
 Waitzia tenuiflora (Vahl) Heynh. accepted as Ixia paniculata D.Delaroche, indigenous
 Waitzia viridis (Aiton) Kresig, accepted as Freesia viridis (Aiton) Goldblatt & J.C.Manning subsp. viridis

Watsonia 
Genus Watsonia:
 Watsonia aletroides (Burm.f.) Ker Gawl. endemic
 Watsonia amabilis Goldblatt, endemic
 Watsonia amatolae Goldblatt, endemic
 Watsonia angusta Ker Gawl. endemic
 Watsonia bachmannii L.Bolus, endemic
 Watsonia bella N.E.Br. ex Goldblatt, indigenous
 Watsonia borbonica (Pourr.) Goldblatt, indigenous
 Watsonia borbonica (Pourr.) Goldblatt subsp. ardernei (Sander) Goldblatt, endemic
 Watsonia borbonica (Pourr.) Goldblatt subsp. borbonica, endemic
 Watsonia campanulata Klatt, accepted as Ixia polystachya L. indigenous
 Watsonia canaliculata Goldblatt, endemic
 Watsonia coccinea Herb. ex Baker, endemic
 Watsonia confusa Goldblatt, endemic
 Watsonia densiflora Baker, endemic
 Watsonia distans L.Bolus, endemic
 Watsonia dubia Eckl. ex Klatt, endemic
 Watsonia elsiae Goldblatt, endemic
 Watsonia emiliae L.Bolus, endemic
 Watsonia fergusoniae L.Bolus, endemic
 Watsonia fourcadei J.W.Mathews & L.Bolus, endemic
 Watsonia galpinii L.Bolus, endemic
 Watsonia gladioloides Schltr. indigenous
 Watsonia humilis Mill. endemic
 Watsonia hysterantha J.W.Mathews & L.Bolus, endemic
 Watsonia inclinata Goldblatt, endemic
 Watsonia knysnana L.Bolus, endemic
 Watsonia laccata (Jacq.) Ker Gawl. endemic
 Watsonia latifolia N.E.Br. ex Oberm. indigenous
 Watsonia lepida N.E.Br. indigenous
 Watsonia marginata (L.f.) Ker Gawl. endemic
 Watsonia marlothii L.Bolus, endemic
 Watsonia meriana (L.) Mill. indigenous
 Watsonia meriana (L.) Mill. var. bulbillifera (J.W.Mathews & L.Bolus) D.A.Cooke, endemic
 Watsonia meriana (L.) Mill. var. meriana, endemic
 Watsonia minima Goldblatt, endemic
 Watsonia mtamvunae Goldblatt, endemic
 Watsonia occulta L.Bolus, indigenous
 Watsonia paucifolia Goldblatt, endemic
 Watsonia pillansii L.Bolus, endemic
 Watsonia pondoensis Goldblatt, endemic
 Watsonia pulchra N.E.Br. ex Goldblatt, indigenous
 Watsonia rogersii L.Bolus, endemic
 Watsonia rourkei Goldblatt, endemic
 Watsonia schlechteri L.Bolus, endemic
 Watsonia spectabilis Schinz, endemic
 Watsonia stenosiphon L.Bolus, endemic
 Watsonia stokoei L.Bolus, endemic
 Watsonia strictiflora Ker Gawl. endemic
 Watsonia strubeniae L.Bolus, endemic
 Watsonia tabularis J.W.Mathews & L.Bolus, endemic
 Watsonia transvaalensis Baker, endemic
 Watsonia vanderspuyiae L.Bolus, endemic
 Watsonia versfeldii J.W.Mathews & L.Bolus, endemic
 Watsonia watsonioides (Baker) Oberm. indigenous
 Watsonia wilmaniae J.W.Mathews & L.Bolus, endemic
 Watsonia wilmsii L.Bolus, endemic
 Watsonia zeyheri L.Bolus, endemic

Witsenia 
Genus Witsenia:
 Witsenia maura Thunb. endemic
 Witsenia pyramidalis (Lam.) Pers. accepted as Lapeirousia pyramidalis (Lam.) Goldblatt subsp. pyramidalis

Wuerthia 
Genus Wuerthia:
 Wuerthia elegans Regel, accepted as Ixia polystachya L. indigenous

Xenoscapa 
Genus Xenoscapa:
 Xenoscapa fistulosa (Spreng. ex Klatt) Goldblatt & J.C.Manning, indigenous
 Xenoscapa grandiflora Goldblatt & J.C.Manning, indigenous
 Xenoscapa uliginosa Goldblatt & J.C.Manning, endemic

References

South African plant biodiversity lists
Iridaceae